Most of the Portuguese vocabulary comes from Latin because Portuguese is a Romance language. 

However, other languages that came into contact with it have also left their mark. In the thirteenth century,  the lexicon of Portuguese had about 80% words of Latin origin and 20% of pre-Roman Gallaecian and Celtiberian, Germanic, Greek and Arabic origin.

Pre-Roman languages of Portugal 

Traces of the languages from native peoples of western Iberia (Gallaeci, Lusitanians, Celtici or Conii) persist in Portuguese, as shown below. Most of the pre-Roman placenames or rivers in Portugal originate from the Hispano-Celtic Gallaecian and Celtiberian languages. There are also a few Iberian, Basque and Tartessian components in Portuguese.

List of Portuguese words of Iberian and Basque origin

Iberian-Basque

 manteiga "butter" ***Uncertain origin, possibly Lat. mantica

Projections on Iberian vocabulary, toponyms and derivations in Portuguese, indicate just a few dozen words in total.

Basque

The Basque influence in Portuguese is believed to have entered mainly through Spanish, because many of those who took part in the Reconquista and later repopulation campaigns in Portugal, were of Basque lineage.

 carrasco "executioner" or "Portuguese oak", from Basque karraska "thunder, crash of falling tree"
 sarna "scabies" from Medieval Latin (7th century, Isidore of Seville, Origines, 4.8.68), but as serna attested in Theodorus Priscianus (Constantinople, 4th century).   however, after studying the variants of the word in the Latin medical treatises, proposes a Hispano-Celtic origin; cf. Middle Welsh sarn "mess" and sarnaf "to wreck".

Names of Basque origin

Forenames
 Inácio variant of Ignatius. ***Of uncertain origin. Often claimed an Etruscan-Latinised derivation but probably Pre-Roman Iberian, Celtiberian or Basque see* Íñigo, ÍñakiVariants: Egnatius (Ancient Roman), Iñaki (Basque), Ignasi (Catalan), Ignác (Czech), Ignaas (Dutch), Iggy (English), Ignace (French), Ignatz (German), Ignác (Hungarian), Ignazio (Italian), Ignas (Lithuanian), Ignacy (Polish), Ignatiy (Russian), Ignac, Ignacij, Nace (Slovene), Ignacio, Nacho, Nacio (Spanish)
 Vasco derived from Basque "belasko", 'small raven'
 Xavier, from Basque Xabier, from etxe berri, meaning 'new house' or 'new home'
 Ximeno, a variant of the medieval Basque given name Semen, root seme < senbe 'son' as found in the ancient Aquitanian name Sembetten, attested form "sehi" as 'child', hypothetical ancient root *seni (cf. Koldo Mitxelena and modern form "senide" = 'brother or sister', 'relative')

Surnames

 Velasco derived from Basque "belasko", 'small raven'

Celtic

Although there is not a comprehensive study or wordcount on how much Celtic, (particularly Gallaecian and words from the Hispano-Celtic group) survived in Portuguese (and Galician); it is fair to say that after Latin, this is the second largest component in the Portuguese culture and language. Projections on Celtic vocabulary (some words may have come via French borrowings starting in the 12th century), toponyms and derivations in Portuguese, indicate well over 1,500 words. The Celtic substratum is often overlooked, due to the strong Latinisation of Celtic-derived words in Portuguese.

List of Portuguese words of Celtic origin

Placenames

Names

Forenames

Surnames 
A considerable number of the Portuguese surnames (spread in all Portuguese-speaking countries and ex-colonies today) is Celtic or of Latinised, Celtic-borrowings. This is not a comprehensive list of those.

A – L 

 Abrunheiro, Abrunho, Abrunhosa, from Protoceltic *agrīnio,
 Arouca, Aroucas, Arouquela Latinised from Celtic *arauca
 Bacelar, Bacelo, from *baccos- 'young man, lad' akin to Gaulish and Breton bach
 Bico, Bicudo, also Bica, Bicalho, from Proto-Celtic *bekko 'beak, kiss', cognate of Italian becco, French bec.
 Carqueijo, Carquejo, Carqueja 'gorse', from Celtic *carcasia, *querquesia, or similar.< Indo-European *pérkus|*pérkus ~ *pr̥kʷéu-|t=oak. Compare pre-Roman tribal name 
 Caxaria, Caxarias, Caxigo,  from the Celtic root *cax < CASSĪCOS ‘oak-tree’
 Cerveja also Cervejaria from Vulgar Latin *cerevisia derived from Gaulish Cognates: Old French cervoise, Provençal, Spanish cerveza; akin to Old Irish coirm, Welsh cwrw, Breton korev.
 Coelho, Coelhos, Coelhoso also Coelha, Coelhas, from Irish coinân, Cornish conyn, Manx coneeyn, Gaelic coineanach, Welsh cwningen, alternatively from Celtiberian *cun-icos 'little dog'
 Colmeia, from a Celtic form *kolmēnā 'made of straw', from *kolmos 'straw', which gave Leonese cuelmo; cf. Welsh calaf "reed, stalk", Cornish kalav "straw", Breton kolo "stalk").
 Lage, Lages, Laginha also Laginhas from the medieval form lagena, from proto-Celtic *ɸlāgenā, cognate of Old Irish lágan, láigean, Welsh llain 'broad spearhead, blade'; akin to Irish láighe 'mattock, spade'.
 Lemos, from Celtic lemo, elm-tree.
 Lotsa, Louza, Lousão, Lousã, Lousado, Louzado, Loisa, Lousano, also Lousan, Lousada from Proto-Celtic *laws

M – Z 
 Magalhães, also Magalhaes and Magalhã from Celtic magal 'great, grandiose'. Toponymic of towns with the same name.
 Menino, from medieval mennino, from proto-Celtic *menno-, akin to Old Irish menn 'kid (goat)', Irish meannán, Welsh myn, Breton menn.
 Minhoca, from medieval form *milocca, from Proto-Celtic *mîlo-, akin to Asturian milu, merucu 'earthworm', Irish míol 'worm, maggot', Welsh, Breton mil 'animal'
 Rego, also Rêgo from proto-Celtic *ɸrikā 'furrow, ditch', akin to Welsh rhych, Breton reg, Scottish/Irish riach 'trace left from something'; cognate of French raie, Occitan, Catalan rega, Basque erreka, Italian riga 'wrinkle'.
 Seara, also Seareiro, Senra,  from medieval senara, a Celtic compound of *seni- 'apart, separated' (cf. Old Irish sain 'alone', Welsh han 'other') and *aro- 'ploughed field'. (cf. Welsh âr, Irish ár 'ploughed field').
 Truta, from Celtic *tructa- freshwater fish of the salmon family. Cognate of French truite, English trout, Catalan truita, Spanish trucha, Italian trota.
 Vassalo Latinised 'vassalum' from proto-Celtic *wasto-, cognate of French vassal, Spanish vasallo, Middle Irish foss 'servant', Welsh gwas 'servant; lad', Breton gwaz

General vocabulary

 abanqueiro [m] 'waterfall' < *'(beaver) dam', formally a derivative in -arium of *abanco, from Proto-Celtic *abankos 'beaver, water demon' cognate of Old Irish abacc 'dwarf', Welsh afanc 'beaver, dwarf', Breton avank 'dwarf, sea monster'. Akin also to Arpitan avans 'wicker'.
 alvo [m] 'white', from Celtic albo* 'white'.  alvura 'whiteness', alvorada 'dawn', alvor 'light, whiteness', alvorecer [v] 'daybreak'.
 amieiro [m] 'common alder', *likely a derivative in -arium of *abona 'river', related to Breton avon, Welsh afon, Irish abha/abhainn 'river'. amieiral 'alder woods', amieira 'young alder tree or hand-basket made of alder or chestnut shoots'. A Galician suggestion points to another Celtic voice ameia
 arpente also arpento 'arpent acre' Latin borrowing (old measurement) likely from Gaulish *arpen or arepennis, cognate of French arpent, Spanish arapende akin to Old Irish airchenn 'short mete, bound (abuttal); end, extremity', Welsh arbenn 'chief'
 abrolho 'sprout, thorn, thicket, rocky surfaces just under water, keys', from Celtic *brogilos 'copse',. abrolhar [v] 'to cover with thorns, to sprout (botanics), to get covered in spots, blisters, to sprout', abrolhamento 'to fence smthg with thorns, cover with sprouts, to cause hardship', desabrolhar [v] 'to sprout, to bloom, to blossom'.
 abrunho/abrunheiro [m] 'sloe', from Vulgar Latin *aprūneu, from Latin prūnum, under the influence of Celtic *agrīnio; akin to Irish áirne, Welsh  eirin 'plum'; cognate of Occitan agranhon, Provençal agreno, Catalan aranyó, Aragonese arañon.
 bacelo [m] 'young vine', from Celtic *baccos- 'young man, lad' akin to Gaulish and Breton bach baceleiro[m] 'young vine nursery, man who specialises in planting new vines', bacelar [v], abacelar [v] 'to plant and tender to new vines', abacelamento 'the act of sorting out young vines (by variety)', bacharelato 'baccalaureat, university degree', Latinised from *baccalaris- person of lower (military) rank or young cadet, bacharel 'same as baccalaureat, chatter-box, chatty or witty person', bacharelar [v] 'to talk too much', bacharelice, bacharelismo 'habit of chatting too much or for too long', barcelo 'white grape variety from Northern Portugal'
 badalo[m] 'bell, penis' from Latinised 'battua'< Gaul. *bathu < Celt. *bathi or *baeti abadalar[v] or badalar[v] , 'to ring a bell, to jabber, to gossip or chat away'.
 balaia [f] also balaio 'small straw-basket' via Old French baleen 'broom (plant)', from Gaul *balatno, metathesis of *banatlo, cognate of Breton balannen, Scots-Gaelic bealaidh, Irish beallaidh, Welsh banadl, Cornish banadhel, Asturian baléu
 barco [m] 'boat, ship' from Proto-Celtic *barga-, loanward into Latin bargo, 'boat'.
 barra [f] 'garret, loft, upper platform', from proto-Celtic *barro-, cognate of Irish, Breton barr 'summit, peak, top', Welsh bar. barrote [m] 'wooden beam'
 barrete [m] 'hood', from Celtic or Gaulish  *birros-'short coat with a hood'. barretada 'greeting someone with your hat', barrete-de-clérigo 'fortification or building work composed of three protruding angles and two sinking ones', enfiar o barrete (popular expression) 'to mislead or deceive someone'.
 bico [m] 'beak, kiss', from Proto-Celtic *bekko-, cognate of Italian becco, French bec. bicar 'to kiss', debicar [v] '(bird)pecking'.
 bilha, [f] 'spigot; stick' to Proto-Celtic *beljo- 'tree, trunk', akin to Old Irish bille 'large tree, tree trunk', Manx billey 'tree', Welsh pill 'stump', Breton pil; cognate of French bille 'log, chunk of wood'.
 bode [m] 'billy-goat, male goat' from Proto-Celtic *bukko- akin to French bouc, loanword into Dutch bok.
boi [m] 'bull, male cow' Latinised form, from Celtic *bou'cow'.  boi-cavalo yak, boieiro cow herder, cowboy, garça-boieira cattle-egret, boiuno bovine.
 borba [f] 'mud, slime, mucus', from proto-Celtic *borwâ-, cognate of French bourbe 'mud'; akin to Irish borb 'mud, slime', bearbh 'boiling', Welsh berw 'boiling', Breton berv 'broth, bubbling'.  borbotar [v], 'to blossom, to bloom', borbulhar [v] 'to burble, to boil', borbulha 'bubble, spot, pimple', borbulhante 'bubbly'. 
 borne [m] 'terminal, metal part of an electrical circuit that connects to an external electrical circuit, inner bark of a tree, lukewarm' from Proto-Celtic *botina 'troop', akin to Old Irish buiden and Welsh byddin 'army' (*budīnā). bornear [v] 'to align an object with the view, generally closing one eye, to put a gun/weapon to aim, i.e.: to aim a cannon'.
 braga [f] '[Old] Hoop iron that held the fetter, male type of trouser, wall that served as a fortification junk, type of naval crane to lift and move weights (ships), small four-string type of guitar'. From [Proto-Celtic] *braco-, cognate of Galician, Spanish, Occitan braga, French braie, Italian brache. braguilha [f] 'trouser-flier, braguinha [f] 'small guitar', bragal [m] 'coarse fabric whose plot is cord, underclothes, old measurement for land demarcation: Portion of a farm (7 or 8 poles) which served as the unit price in certain contracts, set of bucks and fetter', desbragar [v] 'to make dissolute, profligate, to drop your buckles', desbragado [m] 'riotous, foul-mouthed, indecorous, libertine, dissolute, immoral', desbragadamente 'indecorously', desbragamento [m] 'riotous quality, ribaldry, impropriety (behaviour), Bracarense 'relating to Braga, native of that city', brácaro 'a person native of Braga', bracamarte 'old claymore sword which was swung with both hands'.
 brim [m] 'fabric, thread, brime' via Fra. 'brin' < Breton *brienen- 
 brio [m] 'pride, courage, might, power', from Italian brio, from Catalan/Old Occitan briu 'wild', from Celtic *brigos, cognate of Occitan briu, Old French brif 'finesse, style'; akin to Old Irish bríg 'power', Welsh bri 'prestige, authority', Breton bri 'respect'. brioso 'proud, brave, exuberant', briosamente 'proudly, with dignity', desbrio 'lacking pride or courage, a cowardly act', desbrioso 'someone who acts without pride, a coward, a wimp'
 cabra [f] 'goat' Latinised 'capra' from Celtic *gabro- (OIr gabor, OB gabr, gl. caprus, OC gauar, gl. uel capelia, C (in LNN)gaver, ModW gafr, CPNE: 102, DGVB: 173, GPC: 1370-71; PECA: 48). Well attested in G PNN, Gabrus, Gabrius, Gabar, etc. (DLG: 173-74). Formation *kpro- IEW 529 (s.v. *kapro-). ACPN: 79-80; PNPG, Celtic Elements, s.v.; RGC: 172–73. Note that not all LNN in gabro- are by default Celtic; see A. Falileyev, Celtic presence in Dobrudja: Onomastic evidence, in Ethnic Contacts and Cultural Exchanges North and West of the Black Sea from Greek Colonization to the Ottoman Conquest (Iaśi 2005), 296–303.
 cais [m] 'quay, jetty', maybe from French (itself from Norman) quai, from proto-Celtic *kag-yo-, akin to Welsh cae, Cornish ke, Breton kae 'hedge'; French chai 'cellar'.
 camba [f] 'wheel rim' from proto-Celtic *kambo-, cognate of Old Irish camm 'crooked, bent, curved'. Cognate of Occitan cambeta 'part of plough', Limousin Occitan chambija (< *cambica) 'part of plough'. cambada, cambeira 'coil; crooked log for hanging fish', cambela 'type of plough', cambota 'beam', encambar [v] 'to string, to entangle', cambo 'pole, bent', cambaio, cambão 'crooked, lame', cambar [v] 'to change, to alter, to move direction (nautical)', cambalhota 'tumble, gambol', cambalhotar 'to caper, to tumble'. 
  camboa [f] 'trap, hole dug for capturing fish trapped at low tide', from Celtic *combā 'valley' or *cambos 'bent'.
 cambueira [f] 'fishing net used for low tide catch', from Celtic *combā 'valley' or *cambos 'bent'.
 caminho [m] 'pathway', from Vulgar Latin *cammīnus, from proto-Celtic *kanxsman-, cognate of Italian cammino, French chemin, Spanish camino, Catalan camí, Occitan camin, Old Irish céimm, Breton cam 'step'.caminhar 'to walk', caminhada 'walk, journey', caminhante, caminheiro 'hiker, walker, someone who loves to walk, pilgrim', caminheira 'sort of locomotive used in road transportation', caminhável 'area or place adept/safe to walk'
 camisa [f] 'shirt' from Latin, from Gaulish camisia. cognate of Spanish/Occitan camisa, Italian camicia, French chainse. camisola 'jersey', camiseta 'undershirt, singlet', camisa-de-dormir 'nightgown', camisa-de-Venus or camisinha 'condom' (colloquial)
 candado, cando [m] dry tree-branch, stick or trunk, horse hoof, from Celtic *kando- 'bright, white', cognate of Welsh cann 'bright, light'
 canga [f]  'collar, yoke', from Celtic *kambika.
 cangalha [f] 'shoulder yoke, saddle yoke', from Celtic *kambika.
 cangalheta [f] 'rustic saddle, horse saddle', from Celtic *kambika.
 cangalho [m] 'worthless, trashy person or worn out animal', from Celtic *kambika.
 canto [m] 'rim, corner', from proto-Celtic *kanto-, akin to Old Irish cét 'round stone pillar, Welsh cant 'tire rim', Breton kant 'disk'; cognate of Old French chant, Occitan cant. cantoneiro 'road worker', cantonar[v] 'railway traffic control', recanto 'corner', cantinho 'small corner', Cantão, Cantonal 'Swiss Canton, relating to Canton's legal affairs or government, acantoar[v] or acantonar 'to hide, to isolate', canteiro 'vegetable plot, flowerbed, border', acanteirar[v], encanteirar 'to place/arrange in pods'(gardening, bottles, etc.), encanteirado 'in a pod', cantonado 'engraved corner (heraldry)'.
 carqueja,  carqueijeira[f] 'gorse', from Celtic *carcasia, *querquesia, or similar.< Indo-European *pérkus|*pérkus ~ *pr̥kʷéu-|t=oak. Compare pre-Roman tribal name .
 carquilha[f] 'wrinkle, crinkle, furrow', from Celtic *carquila. encarquilhar[v] 'to crinkle', encarquilhado 'wrinkled, with deep (skin) wrinkles'.
 carro [m] 'cart, wagon', from Vulgar Latin carrum, from proto-Celtic *karro-, cognate of Rumanian car, Italian carro, French char, Provençal car, Spanish carro; akin to Irish carr, Welsh car, Breton karr. carroça 'cart', carregar 'to load', acarretar, acartar 'to cart, to carry', carreta 'cart', carrear 'to guide animals in a cart, to drive', carroçaria 'bodywork' (vehicle), carruagem 'carriage', carreto 'load', carrinha 'van', carro-de-mão 'wheelbarrow', carrossel 'carousel', charrete 'carriage, horsecart'.
 caixigo [m] 'oak; Portuguese oak', from *cassīcos, from Celtic *cassos 'curly, twisted', akin to Irish cas 'twist, turn, spin', Old Welsh cascord 'to twist'; cognate of Asturian caxigu, Aragonese caixico, Gascon casse, French chêne 'oak' (< *cassanos).
 centola, santola [m] 'European spider crab', akin to Gaulish personal name CINTULLOS 'the first one', from PCl *kintu- 'first'.
 cerveja [f] 'beer', from Vulgar Latin *cerevisia, from Gaulish Cognates: French cervoise, Provençal, Spanish cerveza; akin to Old Irish coirm, Welsh cwrw, Breton korev. cervejaria[f] 'brewery, brasserie, beer hall', cervejeiro 'brewer'
 cheda[f] 'lateral external board of a cart, where the crossbars are affixed', via Medieval Latin cleta, from proto-Celtic *klētā-, cognate of Irish cloí (cloidhe) 'fence', clíath 'palisade, hurdle', Welsh clwyd 'barrier, wattle, scaffolding, gate', Cornish kloos 'fence', Breton kloued 'barrier, fence'; cognate of French claie 'rack, wattle fencing', Occitan cleda, Catalan cleda 'livestock pen', Basque gereta.
 choco [m] 'cowbell; squid', from proto-Celtic *klokko-, akin to Old Irish clocc, Welsh cloch, Breton kloc'h; cognate of Asturian llueca and llócara 'cowbell', French cloche 'bell', German Glock. chocar 'to bang, to shock', chocalho 'cowbell', chocalhar [v] and chacoalhar [v] 'to shake smthg or someone, to insult someone'.
 cibalho [m] 'bird food' from Gaelic *cib- 'reed', akin to Irish 'cibeach'
 coelho [m] 'rabbit', likely from Celtiberian *cun-icos 'little dog' akin to Irish coinân, Cornish conyn, Manx coneeyn, Gaelic coineanach, Galician coello, Welsh cwningen, Catalan conill, Danish/Swedish/Norwegian kanin, Dutch konijn, Finnish kani, Frisian knyn, German Kanninchen, Icelandic kanína, Italian coniglio, Romansh cunigl, Spanish conejo, Veneto conéjo. coelheira 'rabbit hutch', coelheiro '(dog) good at hunting rabbits', rabicoelha(ornithology) also rabiscoelha 'corncrake, spotted crake', coelhinha 'bunny'
 colmeia [m] 'beehive', from a Celtic form *kolmēnā 'made of straw', from * kŏlmos 'straw', which gave Leonese cuelmo; cf. Welsh calaf "reed, stalk", Cornish kalav "straw", Breton kolo "stalk"). colmeeiro 'hiver', colmeal 'beekeeping space, area'
 comba [f] 'valley, inflexion', from proto-Celtic *kumbā, cognate of North Italian comba, French combe, Occitan comba; akin to Irish com, Welsh cwm 'hollow (land form)', Cornish komm 'small valley, dingle', Breton komm 'small valley, deep water'.
 combo [m] (adj.) 'curved, bent', from Celtic *kumbo-, cognate of Provençal comb, Spanish combo. combar 'to bend'.
 cômoro [m] also combro 'mound, hillock, limit of a patch or field, usually left intentionally unploughed', from proto-Celtic *kom-ɸare-(yo)-, cognate of Old Irish comair 'in front of', Welsh cyfair 'direction, place, spot, acre'. Or either to *kom-boros 'brought together'. acomarar 'to mark out a field (literally to dote with cômoros)'.
 corno 'horn'(OIr corn, OB to PIE *k´er-IEW: 576 (cf. Lat. cornu pl. 'roe'). Although the word has been considered a loan from Latin, there is no reason to deny its Celtic origin (see: P. Sims-Williams, Degrees of Celticity in Ptolemy's Names, in Ptolemy, 9; PNPG, Celtic elements, s.v.).
 curral [m] 'corral, pen; corner', from Celtic *korro-, akin to Middle Irish cor 'circle, turn', corrán 'sickle', Welsh cor 'enclosure', Cornish kor 'turn, veering'.
 Deus [m] 'God' via Latin, 'deus' from Celtic *dēuo-, *dīuo- 'god' (cognate OIr día, MB dou, OC duy, Gl. deus, C. dev in LNN, OW in dúiútít 'divinity', CPNE: 82; EGOW: 51; GPC: 1101; LEIA D-64; PECA: 41). Well attested in Continental Celtic, cf. G. PNN Deo-gnata, diuuo-gna (GPN: 191-92; KGP: 190-91). Traditionally, to PIE *dhei-'shine' IEW: 183–87, LIV: 108 (Skt. deva-, Lat. deus, etc.). ACPN: 70-71; DLG: 142-43; PNPG, Celtic Elements, s.v.
 dorna [f] 'a type of boat; trough, measurement (volume)', from proto-Celtic *durno- 'fist', Irish dorn fish, Breton dorn 'hand'; Akin to Old French, Occitan dorn, 'a handful'. Nevertheless, the Asturian duerna 'bowl' demand a form **dorno-.
 embaixada [f] 'embassy', from Provençal ambaissada, from ambaissa 'service, duty', from proto-Celtic *ambactos 'servant', akin to Welsh amaeth 'farm', Cornish ammeth 'farming', Old Breton ambaith. embaixador [m] 'ambassador', embaixatriz 'madam-ambassador'
 gabela, gavela [f] 'handful, faggot', from Proto-Celtic *gabalā or *gabaglā-, cognate of French javelle, Provençal gavela, Spanish gavilla; akin to Old Cornish gavael 'catch, capture', Irish gabháil 'get, take, grab, capture', gabhal 'fork'.
 galga [f] 'plain stone', from *gallikā, to Proto-Celtic *gallos 'stone', akin to Irish gall, French galet 'gravel' gallete 'plain cake'. galgar [v] 'carving a stone to make it plain and regular'.
 gorar [v] 'sickness, rotting of an egg (hatching), to get confused (thought)', from Proto-Celtic *gʷor-, akin to Old Irish guirid, Welsh and Cornish gori 'to hatch (eggs)' and Breton goriñ. goro 'unfertilized egg, failure, misfortune', gorado 'an egg which didn't hatch, a failed situation or unfortunate person'.
 jarrete [m] 'knee-cap, hock, hamstring' from Gaulish *garra 'leg', akin to Welsh 'garr', which is of uncertain origin; possibly sharing a common origin with Proto-Greek άκαρα 'leg, shank'
 lago [m] 'lake', Latinised 'lacus' from Celtic *locu-, *loco- 'lake' (OIr loch 'lake', OB in lohan gl., lochhaam gl. stagno, OW lichou gl. palu[de]s, luchauc, gl. paluster, Mod W llwch DGVB: 242; EGOW: 103; GPC: 2173; PECA: 72). According to E. Hamp in ZCP 46(1994), 12, independent loans from an unknown substratum language (as well as Lat. lacus, OE lagu, etc.; differently DLG: 206).
 landa [f], lande [f]  'uncultivated or sandy plot' from Proto-Celtic *landā, akin to Old Irish lann 'land, church', Welsh lann 'church lands', French lande 'sandy plot', Provençal and Catalan landa.
 lage [f] 'stone slab', from the medieval form lagena, from proto-Celtic *ɸlāgenā, cognate of Old Irish lágan, láigean, Welsh llain 'broad spearhead, blade'; akin to Irish láighe 'mattock, spade'.
 légua [f] 'league', to Proto-Celtic *leukā, cognate of French lieue, Spanish legua; akin to Old Irish líe (genitive líag) 'stone', Irish lia
 leira [f] 'plot, delimited and levelled field', from the medieval form laria, from proto-Celtic *ɸlār-yo-, akin to Old Irish làr 'ground, floor', Breton leur 'ground', Welsh llawr 'floor'. leiro 'small, ou unleveled, plot', leirar 'land working', leiroto, leiria 'place of small plots, allotments'.
 lerca [f] 'skinny, malnourished cow or cattle in general, skinny woman', from proto-Celtic *wliskā 'stick', cognate of Old Irish flesc.
 lousa also loisa [f] 'flagstone', 'trap', from Proto-Celtic *laws-, cognate of Provençal lausa, Spanish losa, French losenge 'diamond'. enlousar 'to cover with flagstones', lousado 'roof', lousão 'large flagstone', louseiro or loiseiro' 'stonemason', enlousar [v]'to cover with stones, to make a stone wall, to trap, to trick or fool someone'
 lota 'fish auction/market', Latinised borrowing 'lota' < Gaulish *lotta 'flat fish' akin to French lotte, Old Irish lethaid 'he extends, expands', Welsh lledu, llydan 'flounders' Cornish leyth 'flounder, flat-fish'.
 mar [m] 'sea' Latinised 'mare' from Celtic *mori- (OIr muir 'sea', OB mor in compounds, e.g. morgablou gl. aestuaria .i. per quae mare reciprocum tum accedit tum recedit, MB mor; OC mor gl. mare, C (in LNN) mor; OW mor (Liber Landavensis), and in mormeluet gl. testudinum, ModW mor CPNE: 168; DGVB: 259; EGOW: 115; GPC: 2485; LEIA: M-73; PECA: 80). The word is well attested in Continental Celtic, cf. G. more. gl.mare, morici gl. marini (Endlicher Glossary), Pliny's mori marusa (mare congelatum), G. PNN Mori-tasgus, Mori-rigis; see GPN: 232–33, KGP: 245. To PIE *mori- IEW: 748 (Lat. mare, Go. marei, OE mere, E mere). ACPN: 92-93; DLG: 229, PNPG, Celtic Elements, s.v.
 menino [m], menina [f] 'kid, child, baby', from medieval mennino, from proto-Celtic *menno-, akin to Old Irish menn 'kid (goat)', Irish meannán, Welsh myn, Breton menn. meninice or meninez 'childhood, infancy, childishness', meninote 'nipper',  [m].
 minhoca [f] 'earthworm', from medieval *milocca, from Proto-Celtic *mîlo-, akin to Asturian milu, merucu 'earthworm', Irish míol 'worm, maggot', Welsh, Breton mil 'animal'.Derivative: minhoquice 'unfounded suspicions, brooding on smthg unimportant'
 nau [f] 'ship, vessel' Latinised 'navis' from Celtic *nauo- (> navigability) (OIr nau 'ship', M(od)W noe vessel, bowl, platter' GPC: 2592; LEIA: N-5). Cf. Auson. (Epist. 22,1) nausum. To PIE *neh2u- 'boat' IEW: 755-56 (Skt. nau, Lat. navis 'ship', ON nór 'id.', etc.). DLG: 232, s.v. nauson; PNPG, Celtic Elements, s.v. nauo. navegar [v] 'to sail', navegante, Navegador[m] 'sailor', 'Seafarer', nave(archaic) 'ship, boat', navio 'ship'.
 olga [f], 'small farming land, plain between hills', from Proto-Celtic *ɸolkā, cognate of French ouche and Provençal olca.
 peça [f] 'piece', from Vulgar Latin *pettia, from Gaulish petsi, from proto-Celtic *kʷezdi, cognate of Italian pezza, French pièce, Spanish pieza; akin to Old Irish cuit (Irish cuid) 'piece, share, part', Welsh peth 'thing', Breton pez. pedaço, pedacinho, pedação[m] 'piece, little piece, big piece'- ** uncertain whether from Lat.pittacĭu < Gr. pittákion or Proto-Celtic *pettia 'piece'.
 pequeno 'small, kid', from Gaelic *bec-, becan-, beag, beagan- 'small'. pequerrucho[m], pequerruchichinho 'little one', pequenagem, pequenez 'small thing, infancy', pequenino, pequenote, pequeninote pequenininho 'small child, small thing or object', empequenecer [v], empequenitar 'to make small, to make someone feel small', pequenada, pequerruchada 'a group of small children'.
 pitada [f] 'pinch, handful' from Celtic *pit-, pet-, cuid-, cuit-, coda- 'piece'. petar [v] 'to break in small pieces, to tell lies', petiscar [v] 'to knible, to snack, to eat delicacies, to touch slightly, to have a vague knowledge about something or someone', petisco [m] 'delicacy, speciality dish, small bites, snack', petisqueira, petiscaria 'snack-bar, restaurant specialising in local dishes', petanisco 'poking stick', pitéu 'delicacy (food)', petiz 'child, kid', petizada 'kids, children', carrapito 'bob (hair), midget (derogatory)', carapeto 'wild pear', carapeteiro 'wild pear tree, liar', carrapeta, carapeta 'small pion, short person', peta 'white lie'.
 piteira 'drunkenness (colloquial), agave plant, ballast (fishing), debt, default, cigarette holder, cut or blow in the head' from Celtic *pett, pitt- 'small'. 
 rego [m], 'furrow, ditch', from proto-Celtic *ɸrikā, akin to Welsh rhych, Breton reg, Scottish/Irish riach 'trace left from something'; cognate of French raie, Occitan, Catalan rega, Basque erreka, Italian riga 'wrinkle'. regueira 'small water canal', regato 'stream, gully, glen', regatear [v] 'to haggle, to bargain', regateio 'quibble', regateável 'arguable (price)', regateiro 'person who haggles, presumptuous'
 rodovalho [m], 'hefty, short man (with a beard), 'pleuronectidae type of fish (round and flat in shape)' from Celtic *roto-ball-jo-  [m], da forma composta celta *roto-ball-jo-, meaning 'round edges', akin to Irish roth 'wheel', Welsh rhod, and Breton rod combined with Irish ball 'member, organ'.
 saiote [m] 'peticoat, under-skirt' and saia [f] 'skirt', from the medieval form sagia, from an ancient Celtic form from which also Latin sagum 'robe', Greek ságos from Gaulish *sagos- 'coat', fr *seg- 'to hold on or together'.
 seara [f] also senra(archaic), sown field recently broken up, but which is left fallow', from a medieval form senara, a Celtic compound of *seni- 'apart, separated' (cf. Old Irish sain 'alone', Welsh han 'other') and *aro- 'ploughed field'. (cf. Welsh âr, Irish ár 'ploughed field'). seareiro 'cereals farmer, small farmer'
 tasca [f] and tasquinha [m], 'swingle', related to Galatian taskós 'peg, stake'.
 tola [f] furrow from Proto-Celtic *tullo- 'pierced, pricked' [m / f], akin to Irish toll 'hole, hollow', Welsh twll 'hole', Breton toull 'hole'; Catalan toll and Old French tolon 'hill'.
 toleima, tolémia [f], 'foolishness' from ancient Celtic *TULLESMENA (empty, devoid of brains) 
 tona [f] 'skin, bark, scum of milk, surface of any liquid', from proto-Celtic *tondā, cognate of Old Irish tonn, Welsh tonn. toneira 'pot for obtaining butter from the milk', tonel 'wine barrel' cognate of Old French tonel, French tonneau 'barrel, cask'.
 tojo [m], 'gorse, furze (Ulex europaeus)', from Celtic *togi-, akin to Spanish/Gascon toja, French dialectal tuie. fura-tojos 'marten';  tojal, tojeira 'place with tojos'.
  touça, toiça [f], 'young wood, shrub' from ancient Celtic *TOUTIA < *TEUTIĀ (tribal, communal property) 
 toucinho [m], also toicinho 'bacon, lard, pork rash' via Latin 'tuccinum (lardum)', from Celtic tucca 'buttery juice'. toucinheiro, toicinheiro 'lard seller, butcher', toucinho-do-céu 'Portuguese regional sweet made with almonds and egg yolk'
 trado [m] 'auger', from Proto-Celtic *taratro-, cognate of Irish tarathar, Welsh taradr, Breton tarar, Occitan taraire, Catalan taradre, Spanish taladro, French tarière, Romansch tarader. tradar, tradear 'to drill'.
 tranca [f], tranco [m] 'beam, pole, penis', from proto-Celtic *tarankā, tarinca, cognate of Spanish tranca 'club, cudgel', French taranche 'screw bar, ratchet (wine press)', Provençal tarenco; akin to OIr tairinge 'iron nail, tine', Ir tairne 'metal nail, Sc tairnge 'nail'. trancar[v] 'to close, lock or block', destrancar [v] 'to open, unlock or unblock smthg. or someone', trancada 'to hit someone or smthg. with a bat, copulation', trancaria 'pile of wood logs', destrancador 'opener', trança '(hair) brade', entrantrançado 'weaved', tranqueta 'lock, latch, bolt'.
 trevo [m] 'clover', from Proto-Celtic *trebno- farm house, homestead, akin to Irish treb, Cornish tre, Welsh tref, Asturian truébanu, French trèfle, Spanish trébol and Catalan trèvol.
 trengo [m] 'silly, nitwit, little brat, idiot', from Celtic *trenco 'short, small'.
 trincar [v] 'to bite, to snap', possible Latin loanword *trinicāre- (cut into three pieces) from Gaulish *trincare, trancare-to cut (the head), cognate of old Provençal trencar, Catalan trencar, French trancher. tranche 'slice', retrincar, retrinco 'to chew, to cut into smaller pieces', 'patch of a bigger piece', trinco [m] 'latch, lock, bolt', trinca, trincadela, 'bite, knibble, small cut' from Gaulish, possibly from Proto-Celtic *trenco- 'small piece'.
 trincha [f] 'brush, roller, wood carving knife or chisel', from Celtic *trenco 'short, small'.
 truta [f] 'trout', from Celtic *tructa- freshwater fish of the salmon family. Cognate of French truite, English trout, Catalan truita, Spanish trucha, Italian trota.
 varga [f] 'hut; wall made of hurdles;  hurdle, fence', from Celtic *wraga, French barge, akin to Old Irish fraig, Irish fraigh 'braided wall, roof, pen', Br gwrac'hell 'haybale, rick of hay'.
 vasculho [m] 'bundle of straw; broom', from proto-Celtic *baski- 'bundle', cognate of Gascon bascojo 'basket', Asturian bascayu 'broom', Breton bec'h 'bundle, load'.
 vassalo [m] from Vulgar Latin vassalus, from proto-Celtic *wasso- or *wasto- 'young man, squire', cognate of French vassal, Spanish vasallo, Middle Irish foss 'servant', Welsh gwas 'servant; lad', Breton gwaz.  avassalar [v] 'to overwhelm, to stagger, to overpower', avassalador [m], avassalante [n] 'overwhelming'
 vassoura [f] or vassoira [f] 'broom' from Proto-Celtic *basca- or *baski- 'bind, tangle', via Gaulish bascauda, akin to French bâche 'canvas sheet, tarpaulin' Gascon bascojo 'hanging basket', Asturian bascayu, Béarn bascoyes, Welsh basg 'plaiting', Middle Irish basc 'neckband'. vassoirar [v] or vassourar [v] 'to sweep with a broom', vassourada or vassoirada 'broom sweep, broomstick strike/hit'
 vereda [f] 'main road', from the medieval form vereda, from Celtic *uɸo-rēdo-, 'pathway'; akin to Welsh gorwydd 'steed', Vulgar Latin veredus 'horse', French palefroi 'steed' (< *para-veredus). enveredar[v] 'to take or chose a path or direction in life or profession'
 vidoeiro [m] (alternative, archaic spellings bidoeiro [m] or bidoeira [f] 'birch', from Celtic *betu- or *betū-, cognate of Catalan beç, Occitan bèç (< bettiu), French bouleau, Italian betulla (< betula); akin to Irish beith, Welsh bedw, Breton bezv. vidoeiral 'place with birch-trees'.

Germanic languages
The main Germanic influence in Portuguese were the Suebi and Visigoths (also Buri and Vandals).

Their vocabulary in Portuguese is often related to warfare/military topics, animals texugo (badger), natural world orvalho (dew), Human qualities like franqueza (frankness, candour), orgulho (pride), some verbs like ganhar (to gain), town and placenames such as Aldão, Alderete, Albergaria-a-Velha, Albergaria-a-Nova (from Gothic 'haribergo'), Ermesinde and Esposende, where sinde and sende for instance; are derived from the Germanic "sinths" (military expedition), numerous Suebi derivations like, Freamunde (from 'Fredemundus'), Vermunde, Amonde (Onomondi), Samonde, Gimonde, Aldão, Guadramil, Gondomil, Samil, Gosende, Guilhofrei (from Geodefredis), Esmoriz, Esmeriz (toponymics of Hermeric, king of the Suebians), Alhariz (toponymic of Aliaricus), Oriz, Touriz, Roriz, Gavieira, Gondoriz, Gondizalves, Gondar, Gondomar (from Gundomarus), Gondarém, Gudim, Guimarães (from Vimara), Torres Vedras (from Turres Veteras, 'old tower'), Sousa, Terras de Sousa and Terras de Bouro (land of the Buri), Serra do Bouro, Bouro, are found mainly in the Minho (Braga) and Douro (Porto) regions- these two provinces present the highest concentration of Germanic toponyms in the Iberian Peninsula, as they historically correspond to old the Suebic Kingdom in the middle-ages. 

Many of the Germanic words entered the language during the late antiquity, either as words introduced into Vulgar Latin elsewhere, or as words brought along by the Suebi who settled in Gallaecia (Northern Portugal and Galicia) in the 5th century, and also by the Visigoths who annexed the Suebic Kingdom in 585 and ruled until the 8th century AD.
It is very difficult to establish how the Suebi and Visigoth dialects differed from each other during that period, how much linguistic assimilation occurred, and therefore almost impossible to classify words with etymological certainty.

List of Portuguese words of Germanic origin

Because they have different Germanic origins, this list is divided into words that come from English, Frankish, Langobardic, Middle Dutch, Middle High German, Middle Low German, Old English, Old High German, Old Norse, Old Swedish, and Visigothic and finally, words which come from a Germanic root, where the specific source is unknown or uncertain. Projections indicate over 600 Germanic words in Portuguese, with a tendency to increase due to English, German and other modern influences. Some of these words existed in Latin as loanwords from other languages. Some of these words have alternate etymologies and may also appear on a list of Galician words from a different language. Some words contain non-Germanic elements. Any form with an asterisk (*) is unattested and therefore hypothetical.

from Frankish 

 estandarte= a military standard: from Old French estandart, probably from Frankish (*)standhard "standard that marks a meeting place", (implicit sense: "that which stands firmly"), from (*)standan "to stand", (from Germanic (*)standan, from the IE root (*)sta- "to stand") + (*)hard "hard, firm", see ardid below in Germanic section.
 forro= lining(garment), liner, ceiling(house) from Frankish fôdare
 forrar(v)= to cover, to insulate, to wallpaper, to line, to sheathe
 desforra= vindication, revenge, revanche
 ginja= sweet cherry from Frankish *wihsila-
 guante= glove, gauntlet: from Frankish (*)want "gauntlet."
 megengra(o), muzengro, majangro= titmouse (bird), from Frankish meisinga, this in turn related to Celtic meann, menn(small).
 tasca= tavern, inn: from Frankish *taska

from Norwegian 
 slalom= slalom (from the Morgedal/Seljord dialect of Norwegian 'slalåm': "sla," meaning slightly inclining hillside, and "låm," meaning track after skis

Langobardic:
 rufia, rufião= ruffian, thug, bully: from Langobardic *hruf

from Middle Dutch 

 rumo= direction, course, route, pomp, ostentation: from Old Spanish rumbo "each of the 32 points on a compass", from Middle Dutch rume "space, place, rhumb line, storeroom of a ship", from Germanic rūmaz "space, place", from the IE root (*)reu- "space, to open".

from Middle High German 
 estroina= fast liver, bohemian, spend-thrifty, reveller, vagabond: from Mid. High Ger. *striunen- or Old Eng. *strēon-
 estroinice= pleasure seeker's, bohemian conduct or behaviour: from Mid. High Ger. *striunen- or Old Eng. *strēon-
 estroinar (v)=  living the high-life, to live beyond one's means: from Mid. High Ger. *striunen- or Old Eng. *strēon-

from Middle Low German

from Old English 
 arlequim= harlequin: from Italian arlecchino, from Old French Herlequin "mythic chief of a tribe", probably from Middle English Herle king, from Old English Herla cyning, Herla Kyning literally King Herla, a king of Germanic mythology identified with Odin/Woden.  Cyning "king" is from Germanic (*)kunjan "family" (hence, by extension royal family), from the IE root (*)gen- "to birth, regenerate".
 bote= a small, uncovered boat: from Old French bot, from Middle English bot, boot, from Old English bāt, from Germanic (*)bait-, from the IE root (*)bheid- "to split".
 caneco= jug: from Old English *canne < from Proto-Germanic kunnan/kanna
 caneca= mug: *see above
 este= east: from French est, from Middle English est, from Old English ēast, from Germanic (*)aust-, from the IE root (*)awes-, aus "to shine".
 norte= north: from Old French nord, from Old English north, from Germanic (*)north-, from the IE root (*)nr-to "north", from (*)nr- "wikt:under, to the left"
 oeste= west: from Middle English west, from Old English west, from Germanic (*)west-, from (*)wes-to-, from (*)wes-, from (*)wespero- "evening, dusk"
 sul= south (combining form): from Old French sud "south", from Old English sūth, from Germanic (*)sunthaz, from the IE root (*)sun-, swen-, variants of (*)sāwel- "sun"

from Old Norse 
 bife= steak, beefsteak: from English beefsteak, from beef (ultimately from Latin bōs, bovis "cow", from the IE root (*)gwou- "ox, bull, cow") + steak, from Middle English steyke, from Old Norse steik "piece of meat cooked on a spit", from Germanic (*)stik-, see estaca below in the Germanic section.
 guindar [v]= to lift, to be pretentious from (Old) French guinder from Old Norse vinda 'to toss'
 guinda= hoisting rope from Old Norse vinda
 guindaste= crane, winch via French guindeau < Old French guindas, from Old Norse vindáss
 vaga= wave possibly from Old Norse vagr or Gothic vega from Germanic vigan akin to French 'vague'

from Old Swedish 
 dinamite= dynamite, compound word by Swedish inventor and chemist Alfred Nobel
 rena= reindeer, from Old Swe. 'ren'
 tungsténio= tungsten, from Old Swe. 'tung' (heavy) and 'sten' (stone)
 tungsténico= relative to tungsten

from Gothic, Suebian 

 Aguerridamente (fiercely, bravely) from Gothic wirro
 Aguerrido (fierce, courageous, fighter) from Gothic wirro
 Aguerrir [v], Aguerreirar [v] (to fight, to combat, to challenge without fear) from Gothic wirro
 albergar[v] (to host or shelter someone) from Gothic haribergo
 albergue (hostel, youth hostel) from Gothic haribergo
 aleive (treason, traitor) from Gothic lavjan
 aleivosia (treason, deception) from Gothic lavjan
 aleivoso (person/act of a treacherous nature, traitor) from Gothic lavjan
 ardil= (trap, trick, conspiracy) from Gothic 𐌷𐌰𐍂𐌳𐌿𐍃 (hardus) 'hard' or Frankish ardjan
 ardiloso= (cunning, deceptive, tricky) from Gothic 𐌷𐌰𐍂𐌳𐌿𐍃 (hardus) 'hard' or Frankish ardjan
 aringa (military camp) from Gothic hrings
 Atreguar[v] (to discuss/negotiate conditions of a truce) from Gothic trigivo
 Banca (banks, banking system, bench) from Gothic banka
 Bancário (bank, banker)from Gothic banka
 Banco (bank, bench) from Gothic banka
 Banqueiro (banker, financier) from Gothic banka
 Brasa from Gothic *bras, brasa
 Brasalisco from Gothic *bras, brasa
 Brasão from Gothic *bras, brasa
 Braseiro from Gothic *bras, brasa
 Brasido from Gothic *bras, brasa
 Brasil (Brazil) from Gothic *bras, brasa
 Brasonado from Gothic *bras, brasa
 Destacar[v] (to assign troops, to stand out, to surpass) from Gothic stakka
 Destaque (surpass, highlight) from Gothic stakka
 duende= elf, gnome, from *tomt akin to Swedish 'tomten'
 Elmo from Gothic hilms
 Escanção (sommelier) from Gothic skankja
 Escançar[v], Escancear[v], Escanchar[v] (to measure and serve wine) from Gothic skankja
 Espora (spur) from Gothic spaúra
 Esporão (spur) from Gothic spaúra
 Estaca (stake) from Gothic stakka
 Estacada (stockade) from Gothic stakka
 Estacar[v] (to stake) from Gothic stakka
 Fona from Gothic fon
 Fornir[v] from Gothic frumjan
 Godo/Gótico from Gothic guthans
 Guerra, Guerreio (war, conflict) from Gothic wirro
 Guerreão (troublemaker, ruffian) from Gothic wirro
 Guerrear[v] (to fight) from Gothic wirro
 Guerreiro (warrior, fighter) from Gothic wirro
 Guerrilha (guerrilla) from Gothic wirro
 Guia (guide) from Gothic wida
 Guiar[v] (to guide, to lead, to drive a vehicle) from Gothic wida
 Intrabancário (interbanking (system), interbank) from Gothic banka
 Lasca (chip, splinter) from Gothic laska
 Lascar[v] (to cleave, to flake smthg off, to chip smthg) from Gothic laska
 Lascarino or Lascarinho (joker, troublemaker, petty thief) from Gothic laska
 Marta from Gothic marthus
 Multibanco (Cash dispenser, ATM) from Gothic banka
 Roca from Gothic ruka
 Tampa from Gothic tappa
 Tascar[v] from Gothic taskon
 Texugo or Teixugo (badger) from Gothic *thahsuks, shortening of *thahsus-
 Trégua (truce) from Gothic trigivo
 Triscar[v] from Gothic thriskan
 Ufa from Gothic ufjo
 Ufanear[v] or Ufanar[v] (to glorify, to praise) from Gothic ufjo
 Ufano (glorious, vain) from Gothic ufjo
 Vaga (wave) from Gothic vega < vigan

from Germanic languages 

 abandonar (v)= to abandon: from Old French a bandon, from a + bandon "control" from ban "proclamation, jurisdiction, power", from Germanic (*)banwan, (*)bannan  "to proclaim, speak publicly"
 Aguardar[v] (to wait i.e. at a queue) from Germanic wardaz, Visigothic wardjan Gothic wer
 alemão= of Germany (adjective), the German language: from Late Latin Alemanni, an ancient Germanic tribe, from Germanic (*)alamanniz (represented in Gothic alamans), from ala- "all" + mannis, plural of manna-/mannaz "man" (Gothic manna) from the IE root (*)man- "man"
 Barão, Baronesa (baron, baroness) from Germanic baro
 bóia= a buoy: probably from Old French boie, from Germanic, possibly from Old High German bouhhan, from Germanic (*)baukna- "signal", from the IE root (*)bha- "to shine"
 Branca (female name, white female) from Germanic blanka
 Branco (common Portuguese surname) from Germanic blank
 Branco (white, pale) from Germanic blank
 branco= white, white person, blank: from Vulgar Latin (*)blancus, from Germanic (*)blank- "to shine", from the IE root.
 Brancura (whiteness) from Germanic blank
 Branqueio (to bleach, to whiten or launder smthg i.e. money laundering) from Germanic blank
 Branquela (pejorative for White person) from Germanic blank
 Branquicento (of faded, pale appearance) from Germanic blank
 brincadeira= joyful play, joke, prank from Proto-Germanic *blīkaną/blinkaną.
 brincar= to play from Proto-Germanic *blīkaną/blinkaną.
 brinquedo= toy from Proto-Germanic *blīkaną/blinkaną.
 churrasco, churrasqueira, churrascaria, churrascar[v]= from Suebian/Gothic SAURUS
 Escarnecedor, from Germanic skernjan
 Escarnicação, from Germanic skernjan
 Escarniçador, etc. from Germanic skernjan
 Escarniçar[v] (to mock, to show contempt for someone or a situation) from Germanic skernjan
 Escarninhamente, from Germanic skernjan
 Escarninho, from Germanic skernjan
 Escárnio, from Germanic skernjan
 Escarnir[v] *Escarniçar[v] (to mock, to show contempt for someone or a situation) from Germanic skernjan
 estaca= a stake: from Germanic (*)stak-, from the IE root (*)steg- "pale, post pointed stick". 
 Ganhar[v] (to gain) from Germanic waidanjan
 Ganho (gain, profit) from Germanic waidanjan
 Gavião (hawk) from Germanic gabilans
 Guarda (guard, warden, police) from Germanic wardaz, Visigothic wardjan, Suebian wardon Gothic wer
 Guardar[v] (to guard, to safekeep, to protect) from Germanic wardaz, Visigothic wardjan Gothic wer
 guardar= to guard, watch over, keep, observe (a custom): from Germanic (*)wardōn "to look after, take care of", from the IE root (*)wor-to-, "to watch", from (*)wor-, (*)wer- "to see, watch, perceive"
 Guardião (guard, legal guardian) from Germanic wardaz, Visigothic wardjan Gothic wer
 Resguardar[v] (to shelter, to cover, to protect smthg or someone i.e. from the elements) from Germanic wardaz, Visigothic wardjan, Suebian wardon Gothic wer
 Roubador (robber, thief) from Germanic raubon
 Roubalheira (robbery, theft) from Germanic raubon
 Roubar[v] (to rob) from Germanic raubon
 Roubo (robbery) from Germanic raubon
 sopa = soup,
 venda= blindfold: from Proto-Germanic * bǐnda-

Others

A
 abandonar; abandono= "to abandon" ; "abandon"
 atacar= "to attack"
 abordar= "to attack (a problem)"

Germanic Names
Ancient Roman-derived names are the most numerous in Portugal and Portuguese-speaking countries. Together with Germanic-derived names they constitute the majority of those (and similarly to most European/Western countries inherited also a number of ancient Greek and Hebrew names) today. With globalisation, a number of new Germanic names (and other origins) exist in Portuguese. Because they stem from the same root, Portuguese and Galician share common Germanic names, inherited from the Suevi (who settled in northern Portugal and  Galicia  in 409 AD), Visigoths, Vandals, Buri and other Germanic peoples, were often the most common Portuguese-Galician names during the early and high Middle Ages. This article deals with Germanic personal names recorded and used in northern Portugal, Galicia and its adjoining regions: territories of the kingdom of the Suebi during the early Middle Ages from its 409 settlement to the 12th century.

Germanic names 

Germanic names were the most common personal names in Portugal-Galicia (Gallaecia) during the early and high Middle Ages, surpassing Christian and Roman names in number and popularity. The names, primarily of East Germanic origin, were used by the Suebi, Goths, Vandals and Burgundians. With the names, the Galicians-Portuguese inherited the Germanic onomastic system; a person used one name (sometimes a nickname or alias), with no surname, occasionally adding a patronymic. More than 1,000 such names have been preserved in local records. and in local toponyms.

Many of the Germanic names were composite, with the second element usually a noun with the same gender of the bearer. Others were hypocorisms formed from a composite name or deriving from it. Less frequently, a name was a noun or an adjective.

These names were transmitted to the Suevi with the usual Germanic rules of inheritance, which were variations (passing one element of the name; Rechiar was the son of Rechila, who was the son of Hermeric) and alliteration (names beginning with the same sound; Maldras was the son of the nobleman Masila). Full names were later transmitted from grandfather to grandson (commemoration), following a trend common until the present in most of western Europe.

Adaptations 
In addition to the conversion of many Germanic endings into Romance or Latin endings, the names had phonetic adaptations such as the change of word stress from the first to the penultimate syllable, the conversion of most [þ] into [t] or [d] and the conversion of [h] into [k] before a consonant. [W] was initially preserved, although noted as [u] or [oy] before becoming [gw] (or, less commonly, [b]). These early inherited names underwent Western Romance and Galician changes from Latin, such as consonant lenition and palatalization. This contributed to a large number of variants in recorded names; Ostrofredus was recorded in Portugal-Galicia as Ortofredus, Ostofredo, Ostouredus, Ostrofedone, Stobredo and Strofredo.

Names used by the Suevi 
The following names, used by the Suevi of Gallaecia during the fifth and sixth centuries, were recorded in chronicles, inscriptions and acts of local ecclesiastical councils:
Hermericus, Heremigarius, Rechila, Rechiarius, Agriulfum, Maldras, Massila, Framta, Frumarius, Rechimundus, Remismundus, Veremundus, Chararici, Ariamirus, Ildericus, Theudomirus, Miro, Nitigisius, Uittimer, Anila, Remisol, Adoric, Eboricus, Siseguntia f, Audeca, Malaricus, Pantardus, Neufila, Hildemirus, Commundus, Ermaricus, Sunila, Becilla, Gardingus, Argiovitus, Gomedei, Rodomiro, Ermengontia f, Remisiwera f, Thuresmuda f, Suinthiliuba f.

Many of the names, used by kings such as Miro, Reckila and Theudemirus, were used for local toponyms: Mirón, Requián, Requiás, Requiás and Receá, Tuimil and Toimil.

Roots 

The following is a list of the roots used to form Germanic personal names in Galicia-Portugal and northwestern Iberia. Many are related to war, victory, fame, boldness, strength and warlike qualities (bald-, funs-, hild-, gund-, nand-, rod-, seg-, send-), totemic animals (ar-, wulf-, ber-, ebur-) and weapons (brand-, bruni-, rand-, saru-); many others refer to knowledge, love and other peaceful qualities (fred-, leob-, mun-, ragi-, rad-, uin-). Some refer to the condition of ruler or master (fro-, ric-, vald-, Froya, Theodinus, Tructinus, Hendinus). Another group refers to the tribe, nation or country (conia-, fulc-, teod-, leod-, man-, truct-, gavi-, gogi-, kend-), and another appears to refer to Huns (Hun-), Suevi (Sav-), Goths (Gut-), Vandals (Vandal-), Celts (Vala-), Vendians/Slavs (Venet-), Galindians/Balths (Galind-), Franks (Frank-), Saxons (Sax-), Angles (Engl-), Danes (Dan-) and other peoples. Although some elements are identical to others found in Celtic anthroponymy (And-, Dag-, -mar, -riks), others appear to be adaptations of Latin words and names incorporated in the Danube region: Florens, Fortis, Crescens.

Forms marked with an asterisk are unrecorded and hypothetical. PGmc is an abbreviation for Proto-Germanic.

 ab-, to PGmc *abōn "man": Abbelinus
 abr-, to PGmc *abraz "huge, strong": Abragasia, Abrecan, Abronilli
 ad- (later a-), to PGmc *haþuz "battle, fight": Adefonsus, Adegundia, Adeqisio, Aderedus, Aderico, Adesindus, Adica, Adiero, Adarius, Adila, Adileobo, Adileova, Adimirus, Adolinus, Adosinda
 adal-, to PGmc *aþalaz "noble": Adala, Addalinus, Adegaster, Adelasindo, Atalamondo
 agi-, egi- (later ei-), to PGmc *agez "fear" or *agjō "edge": Agimadus, Agio, Agiulfus, Aidio, Egeredus, Egica, Egila, Agila, Egildus, Agildus, Egilo, Ailo, Eigonza, Eileuva, Eilleus, Eimirus, Eindu, Eirigu, Eisindus, Haginus
 agr- possibly to PGmc *akraz "field, open land": Agrivulfum, Agromirus
 aist-, to PGmc *aistēn "to give reverence": Aistando
 ala-, to PGmc *ala "all, wholly": Alaguntia, Alamiro, Alaricus, Alarius, Alatrudia, Alobrida, Aloindo, Aloitus, Alvarus
 alb-, to PGmc *albaz "elf": Albiaster, Alvaricus, Alvatus
 ald-, to PGmc *aldaz "old": Aldemirus, Aldereto, Aldericus, Aldia, Aldinus
 aldr-, to Proto-Germani *aldran "age, life": Aldras, Aldroitus
 ali-, to PGmc *aljaz "other": Alia, Alio, Aliaricus, Alifreda, Aliulfus, Aliverga, Alivergo, Aliverko, Aliverta, Alivertus, Alliefredus
 am-, eim-, em-, en-, to PGmc *haimaz "dear": Amingus, Eimoricus, Emila, Emilo, Emiso, Enaredus, Engildus, Entrudi
 amal-, to PGmc *amal- "valiant, brave": Amalilli
 amed-, to PGmc *amitaz "continuous": Amedon, Amedeiro
 an-, to PGmc *an- "forefather": Anagildus, Analsus, Anila, Anilo, Anualdus, Anulfo
 and-, ant-, to PGmc *anda "throughout": Andeatus, Andericus, Andiarius, Andifonso, Andila, Andilevo, Andilo, Anditio, Ando, Andosindus, Andulfus, Antemirus
 ans-, to PGmc *ansuz "god": Ansedeus, Ansemarus, Ansemirus, Ansemondus, Anseredo, Ansericus, Ansetrudia, Ansila, Ansileova, Ansilo, Ansiulphus, Ansiunda, Ansobrida, Ansoi, Anson, Ansuallo, Ansuario, Ansueto, Ansuildi, Ansvertus
 aquis-, to PGmc *akwesiz "axe": Aquisilde
 ar-, to PGmc *arnōn "eagle" or *arwaz "swift, ready": Aragunti, Arosinda, Arosindus, Arualdus, Aruildi, Arumundo
 ard-, to PGmc *harduz "hard" or *arduz "land": Ardabastus, Ardericus, Ardaldus, Ardesendus, Ardilo, Ardulfus, Artemiro, Erdebredo
 ari-, argi-, to PGmc *harjaz "army": Arebuldo, Argeberto, Argefonsus, Argemirus, Argemondo, Argenilli, Argeredus, Argericus, Argesindus, Argeva, Argevadus, Argevitus, Argifonsa, Argifredus, Argileuva, Argilo, Argioi, Argiuolus, Argivastro, Ariulfus
 aria-, to PGmc arjaz "noble": Arias, Ariastre
 arn-, to PGmc *arnuz "eagle": Arnadius, Arnaldus, Arnulfo
 asc-, to PGmc *askaz "ash-tree": Ascarigus, Ascarius, Asculfo
 ase-, to PGmc *haswaz "grey": Asemondus, Asileva, Asinoy, Asiulfus, Asofuda, Asoi, Asoredus
 asp-, to PGmc *aspōn "aspen": Asparigus
 ast-, to PGmc *astaz "branch" or *austaz "east": Astaguerra, Asterigo, Astileuva, Astredo, Astualdu, Astulfus
 astr-, ostr-, obstr-, stor-, to PGmc *austraz "east": Astragis, Astragundia, Astramondus, Astratus, Astremarus, Astriverga, Astrogoto, Astruara, Astruario, Astruedu, Astruildi, Astrulfus, Obstrisinda, Ostamalus, Ostosia, Ostrofreda, Ostrofredo, Ostromirus, Astromirus, Estromirus, Storesindo
 at- (later ad-) to PGmc *haþuz "war": Ataulfus, Atarius, Atericus, Aton
 atan-, tan-, to PGmc *aþnaz "year": Atanagildus, Atanaricus, Atanus, Tanina, Tanino, Atanitus, Tano, Tanoi, Tenildi
 att-, to PGmc *attōn "father": Atauldus, Attan, Attila, Attina
 aud-, od-, to PGmc *audaz "wealth": Audeca, Audesinda, Audila, Audinus, Audibertus, Audofredo, Audugus, Ausendus, Oda, Odemundus, Odamirus, Odericus, Odisclus, Odorica, Odoynus, Oduarius, Otualdo
 aur-, or-, to PGmc *auraz "sand, sea": Auresindus, Aurilli, Orosinda
 aus-, os-, to PGmc *aus- "shining": Osoarius, Osobredus, Osmundo, Osoredo, Osorico, Ausarigus, Osoy, Ossila, Ozandus
 bad- (later ba-), to PGmc *badwō "battle": Badamundus, Bademirus, Badila, Badosindus
 bait-, to PGmc *baitaz "ship, boat": Baitus
 bald-, balt-, to PGmc *balþaz "bold": Baldemarius, Baldemirus, Balderedo, Balderico, Baldesindo, Baldila, Baldoi, Baldoigius, Baltarius, Baltino, Balto
 bar-, to PGmc *baraz "man": Barilli, Barsilli, Baron, Baroncellus, Baronza, Barvaldus
 bat-, to PGmc *bataz "good": Bati, Batinus, Baton
 baud-, to PGmc *baudiz "ruler": Baudemirus, Baudesindus
 baz-, to PGmc *bazaz "naked": Bazarius
 beg-, bag-, bec-, bac-, to PGmc *bēgaz "contest, quarrel": Baga, Bega, Becilla, Bagesindus, Becosindo, Bagina, Bagino, Baquina, Baquino, Begica, Pegito
 ber-, to PGmc *berōn "bear": Bera, Bergundi, Berila, Berildi, Berosildi, Berilo, Berina, Berinus, Beroi, Berosindus, Berulfus
 berg-, verg-, to PGmc *bergaz "shelter": Bergas, Bergila, Vergilli, Vergina, Virgia
 bern-, to PGmc *bernuz "bear": Bernaldus
 bert-, vert-, to PGmc *berhtaz "bright": Berta, Bertamirus, Bertarius, Bertinus, Berto, Bertosinda, Bertuara, Betrulfus, Bretenandus, Vertila
 bett-, bitt-, probably to PGmc *bitraz "bitter": Betellus, Betericus, Bitilo, Bitto
 bid-, to PGmc *bidō "request, prayer": Biddi, Bidualdus
 bil-, bel-, to PGmc *bilaz "good" or *bīþlan "axe": Bela, Belavrida, Belesarius, Belestrio, Belfonsus, Bellengo, Bellerto, Bello, Belloy, Belmirus, Billa
 bland- to PGmc *blandiz, likely an adjective derived from *blandaną "to blend, make murky; to mix, mingle": Blandila
 bliv-, to PGmc *blēwaz "blue": Bliviaricus
 bon-, to PGmc *bōniz "prayer, petition": Bonesindus, Bonilde, Bonimiro, Boninus, Boniza, Bonoi
 bot-, but-, to PGmc *bōtō "good, profit": Botan, Butila
 brand-, to PGmc *brandaz "fire, sword": Brandericus, Brandila, Brandinus, Brandiulfus, Brandon
 brun-, to PGmc *brunjōn "breastplate": Brunildi
 burgal-, to *Bulgar- "? Bulgarian": Burgala
 ca-, to PGmc *ga- "with": Camundus
 canut-, to PGmc *knūtaz "bold": Canuto
 car-, kar-, to PGmc *karō "care": Karmirus
 carl-, to PGmc *karlaz "man": Carlo
 cart-, kart-, to PGmc *krattaz "cart, wagon": Cartinus, Cartemirus
 cen-, to PGmc *kwenōn "woman": Cenabrida, Cenusenda
 cend-, kend-, zend-, quint-, to PGmc *kenþan "child": Cendamiro, Cendas, Cendon, Kenderedus, Kendulfus, Kindiverga, Quintila, Quintilo, Zendasindo
 cens-, zens-, possibly to PGmc *zinz "tribute" or *kwēniz "woman": Censerigus, Censoi, Zenzitus
 conia-, to PGmc *kunjan "tribe, nation": Coniaricus
 cresc-, possibly to Latin crescens "thrive": Crescemirus
 criz-, to PGmc *krēsō "dainty, food": Crizila
 dad-, ded-, to PGmc *dēdiz "deed": Dada, Dadila, Dadilo, Dadinus, Dado, Dede
 dag-, dac-, to PGmc *dagaz "day": Dacamiro, Dacoi, Dagadrudia, Dacaredus, Dago, Daildus
 dan-, da-, to PGmc *daniz "Dane": Damiro, Damondus, Danila
 dest-, test-, possibly to Latin dexter "right, skilful": Destoy, Destericus, Desteilli
 doc-, duc-, to PGmc *dōgiz "day": Docemiro, Ducila
 dod-, no clear etymology; possibly to PGmc *dēdiz "deed": Dodo, Doda
 dom-, to PGmc *dōmaz "judgement, ruling": Domerigo
 dulc-, dolc-, to PGmc *dulgan "enmity", *dulgaz 'law, debt': Dulcemirus, Dolcemondus
 ebr-, ebur-, evor-, to *eburaz "boar": Ebragundia, Ebreguldus, Ebregulfus, Ebrildi, Eburicus, Evorinus
 elp-, to PGmc *helpō "help": Elperico
 elpand-, to Germanic *elpandus "elephant": Elpandus
 engl-, to PGmc *angilaz "Angles": Engladius
 engo-, to PGmc *Ingwaz "a god": Engomirus, Engoredus, Engorigus
 ens-, possibly to Latin ensis "sword": Ensalde, Iensericus
 er-, her-, to PGmc *heruz "sword": Erifonsus, Eroigius, Eruulfus, Herus
 erm-, herm-, to PGmc *ermenaz "great": Ermaldus, Ermedrudia, Ermefara, Ermefreda, Ermefredo, Ermegildus, Ermegis, Ermego, Ermegoto, Ermegotus, Ermegundia, Ermelindus, Ermemirus, Ermericus, Ermerote, Ermesinda, Ermiarius, Ermila, Ermildi, Ermileuva, Ermitus, Ermoleo, Ermosindus, Ermoygius, Ermulfo, Heremigarium, Hermecisclus, Hermellus
 evo-, to PGmc *ehwaz "horse": Euvenandus, Eva, Evorido, Evosindo, Ivolicus, Ibilli
 faf-, to PGmc *faff-, possibly related to Indo-European *papp- "dad": Faffila, Faffia 
 fag-, to PGmc *fagenaz "glad, joyful": Fagila, Fagildus, Fagilo, Faginus
 fald-, to PGmc *faldiz "fold, cloak": Falderedo, Falgildus, Fardulfus
 fand-, to PGmc *fanþjōn "infantryman": Fandila, Fandina, Fandinus, Fannus
 faq-, fak-, to PGmc *fah- "glad, joyful": Facalo, Facco, Fakino, Faquilo
 far-, to PGmc *faran "journey, ship": Faregia, Farella, Farino, Farita, Farnus, Framiro, Fraredus, Frarigo, Fregulfus, Ferildi
 fat-, to PGmc *fatan "cloth; vessel": Fatu, Fateredus
 fel-, fil-, to PGmc *felu "much, very": Felellus, Felgirus, Felmiro, Filisteus, Filivertus, Filon
 flor-, to PGmc *flōraz "floor" or Latin florens "blooming, prosperous": Floresindus
 fof-, possibly to PGmc *fōþrą "load, wagonload": Fofo, Fofinus, Fofellus
 fons-, funs-, to PGmc *funsaz "eager, ready": Fonso, Fonsa, Fonsinus, Fonsellus
 fradi-, to PGmc *fraþīn "efficacy": Fradegundia, Fradila, Fradiulfus
 fram-, to PGmc *framaz "forward; valiant": Framila, Framilli, Framtan, Framuldo
 frank-, franc-, to PGmc *frankōn "javelin; Frank": Francellus, Francemirus, Franco, Francoi, Francolino, Frankila, Frankilo
 fred-, frid-, to PGmc *friþuz "peace" or *frīdaz "fair, beautiful": Freda, Fredamundus, Fredario, Fredegundia, Fredemiro, Fredenanda, Fredenandus, Fredericus, Fredesinda, Fredilli, Fredisclus, Fredoaldus, Fredoindus, Fredosindus, Freduarius, Fredulfus, Fredus, Fridiverto
 froa-, frau-, frog-, froy-, fron-, to PGmc *frawjōn "lord, master": Froarengus, Fralenko, Frogeva, Frogildi, Frogina, Frogiulfo, Froiellus, Froila, Froilo, Froiloba, Froisenda, Froisendus, Fronildi, Fronosili, Fronuldo, Froya, Froyo, Froyslo, Fruaricus, Frugildus, Fruginus, Frauino, Frumirus, Frunilo
 frum-, from-, to PGmc *frumōn "foremost, first" and *frumistaz "first": Fromista, Fremosilli, Fromaldus, Fromaricus, Fromildus, Fromosinda, Fromosindus, Fruma, Frumarius, Frumellus, Frumildi
 fulc-, to PGmc *fulkan "crow, army": Fulcaredus
 gad-, gat-, to PGmc *gadōn "comrade": Gademiro, Gadenanda, Gaton
 gael-, gel-, to PGmc *gailaz "merry": Gaella, Gelmiro, Geloira
 gaf-, gef-, geb-, to PGmc *gebō "gift": Gaffo, Gebuldus, Gefera
 gaid-, to PGmc *gaidō "spearhead, arrowhead": Gaidus
 gaif-, to PGmc *waibjanan "to surround": Gaifar
 galind-, kalend-, to PGmc *galind- "Galindian" (a Baltic people): Galindus, Kalendus
 gan-, possibly to Germanic gan "enchantment": Ganati, Ganilli, Ganiti, Ganoi
 gand-, to PGmc *gandaz "wand, staff": Gandila, Gandinus, Gandulfo, Gandus
 gard-, to PGmc *gardaz "house, enclosure": Gardingus, Gardulfus
 gas-, ges-, gis-, ger-, gir-, to PGmc *gaizaz "spear": Gasuildi, Gera, Gesa, Gero, Geserigus, Gesmira, Germira, Gesmiro, Gesulfus, Ierulfus, Giraldus, Gismundus, Germundus, Gisovredus, Gisvado
 gast-, to PGmc *gastiz "guest": Gastre
 gaud-, caud-, no clear etymology; possibly to *gaut- "Goth" or Latin gaudeo "rejoice": Caudemirus, Gauderigus,  Gaudesindo, Gaudilani, Gaudilli, Gaudinas
 gav-, gau-, gogi-, cogi-, gagi-, cagi-, kegi-, to PGmc *gaujan "district": Cagildo, Cagita, Cagitus, Gagica, Gaufredus, Gaulfus, Gavila, Gavina, Gavinus, Gega, Gegitus, Gigelus, Gogia, Gogilli, Gogina, Gogitus, Gogius, Goymundus, Guimundus, Guginus, Gugivertus, Guimirus, Guiricus, Guisenda, Goysenda, Guisindus, Kagilda, Keila
 geld-, gild-, kelt-, to PGmc *geldan "tribute, recompense": Geldemirus, Gildaricus, Gildo, Keltoi
 gen-, ian-, ion-, to PGmc *gennan "beginning": Genildi, Ionilde, Genlo, Genobreda, Gemundus, Ianardo, Ionarico
 gend-, possibly to PGmc *gantijaną "To make whole; make complete": Gendo, Gendina
 get-, git-, "glory": Geda, Getericus, Getilli, Getina, Getoy, Gidiberto, Gitarius, Gitesindus, Gitio
 gisl-, viscl-, cisl-, to PGmc *gīslaz "hostage": Cisla, Viclavara, Viscaverga, Visclafredo, Visclamirus, Visclamundus, Visclario
 givel-, to PGmc *geb(e)lōn "skull, gable": Givellan
 glad-, to PGmc *gladaz "bright, glad": Gladila
 god-, gud- (later go-, gu-), to PGmc *gōdaz "good": Godefredus, Godegildus, Godella, Godellus, Godemiro, Godenanda, Godesinda, Godoigia, Godomundus, Gudenandus, Guderedus, Guderigo, Gudesindus, Gudesteus, Gudigeba, Gudila, Gudileuva, Gudilo, Gudilulfo,Gudiverga
 gol-, to PGmc *gōljanan "to greet", gōlaz "pride": Golinus, Gollo
 gom-, gum-, to PGmc *gumōn "man": Gomadus, Gomaldo, Gomaredus, Gomarigus, Gomesindo, Gomita, Gomulfus, Gomundus, Guma, Gumarius, Gumellus, Gumila, Gumito
 gram-, to PGmc *gramaz "furious": Gramila
 gran-, to PGmc *grannaz "slim, slender" or *granō "moustache": Granilo
 grim-, to PGmc *grīmōn "mask, helmet": Grima, Grimaldus
 gris-, to PGmc *grīsanan "to dread" or *grīsaz "grey": Grisulfus, Gresomarus
 guald-, to PGmc *waldaz "powerful, mighty": Gualdarius, Gualdeo
 guandal-, to PGmc *wandilaz "Vandal": Guandalisco, Guandalar
 guld-, to PGmc *wulþuz "splendour": Goldegildo, Goldredo, Guldarius, Gulderigus
 guldr-, goltr-, to PGmc *wulþraz "wonderful, precious": Goldregodo, Gulderes, Gualdramirus
 gulf-, golf-, to PGmc *wulfaz "wolf": Golfarico, Gulfarius, Gulfemirus
 gund-, gunt-, gunz-, cunt-, gond-, to PGmc *gunthz "fight": Gonceria, Gondella, Gondenanda, Gonso, Gonta, Gontemondus, Gontere, Gonderes, Gontoi, Gontualdo, Gonza, Guncitus, Gundarius, Gundebredo, Gundebrida, Gundelinus, Gundemarus, Gunderamnus, Gunderedo, Gunderigus, Gunderona, Gundertia, Gundesindus, Gundifortis, Gundigeva, Gundila, Gundilo, Gundisalva, Gundisalvus, Gundiscalcus, Gundivadus, Gundivaldo, Gundivera, Gundiverga, Gundon, Gundulfo, Guntato, Guntedrudia, Guntellus, Guntemirus, Gunterotis, Gunti, Guntiesclo, Guntigio, Guntilli, Gundesilli, Guntina, Guntinus, Guntuigia
 gut- (later god-), to PGmc *gutōn "Goth": Gotesendus, Goto, Gota, Goton, Gudegisus, Gutellus, Gutemirus, Gutemondo, Gutilli, Gutilo, Gutina, Gutinus, Guto, Guta, Gutumarus
 hend-, ind-, hand-, probably related to Burgundian hendinus "king": Endulfus, Hamdino, Indisclus
 hild-, ild-, eld-, ald-, to PGmc *heldjō "battle": Alderedus, Alduarius, Eldan, Eldebona, Eldegeses, Eldegotus, Eldegundia, Eldemirus, Eldemundus, Eldesinda, Eldesindus, Eldigia, Eldinus, Eldivercus, Eldivertus, Eldo, Eldoigius, Elleca, Ildebredus, Ildefonsus, Ilderigus, Ildiverga, Ildoi, Ildoncia, Ildras, Ilduara, Ildulfus
 ik-, eq-, ig-, possibly to PGmc *eka "I": Igo, Ika, Ikila
 it-, id- (no clear etymology): Idiverto, Itila, Itilo, Itimondo, Itaultus
 iuv-, iub- no clear etymology; possibly to Latin iuvenis "young" or a metathesis of PGmc *webaną "to weave" (cf. *wesuz → ius-, *westan → iust-): Iovellinus, Iubarius, Iubinus, Iuuisclus, Iuvatus, Iuvericus, Iuvila, Iuvitus
 ket-, qued-, quid-, to PGmc *kweþanan "to say": Kedisilo, Ketemera, Ketenando, Keti, Ketoi, Quedesendo, Quedulfus, Quidemirus, Quidericus, Quitarius, Quitoi
 lal-, lel-, lil- probably to Latin lallus "lullaby": Lalla, Lalli, Lallina, Lallinus, Lallus, Lelino, Leliola, Lilliola, Lelli, Lilla, Lilli, Lillo, Lilla
 leo-, to PGmc *hlewaz "glory, renown": Leomirus
 leode-, leude-, to PGmc *leudiz "man, people": Ledla, Leodarius, Leodefredus, Leodegasti, Leodegisius, Leodegundia, Leodemiro, Leodemundo, Leoderigus, Leodesindo, Leodeuigus, Leodo, Leodulfus
 leov-, leub-, to PGmc *leubaz "beloved": Leovaldo, Leovegildus, Leovegoto, Leoveredus, Leoverigus, Leoverona, Leoverto, Leovesenda, Leovesindus, Leovilli, Leovus, Leuba, Leubegutus, Liuvilo, Lovoi, Lubellus, Lubila, Lubinus
 lot-, to PGmc *hludaz "famous": Lotarius
 mact- (later meit-), to PGmc *mahtiz "power, might": Meitinus, Matericus, Mectubrida, Meitilli, Meitulfus
 mag-, to PGmc *magenan "might, power": Magan, Magila, Magitus, Maniaricus, Maniarius, Magnitus, Maniulfus, Megildus
 mal- (unclear etymology, possibly related to PGmc *malanan "to grind"): Malaricus, Malaredus
 malasc-, possibly to PGmc *malskaz "proud": Malasco
 maldr-, possibly to PGmc *maldriz "flour": Maldras
 man- (later ma-), to PGmc *manan "fellow": Manildi, Manusildi, Manileuva, Manilla, Maninus, Manosenda, Manosindus, Manualdus, Manulfus, Menegundia
 mand-, mant-, to PGmc *manþaz "kind": Mandila, Mandinus, Mandulfo, Mantellus
 mann- (later man-), to PGmc *mannz "man": Manitus, Manna, Mannello, Manni, Manno, Manoim, Mansuara
 marc-, to PGmc *markō "region, border" or *marhaz "horse": Marco, Marcosendus, Marcitus
 mart-, possibly to PGmc *marþuz "marten": Martila
 matl-, matr-, to PGmc *maþlan "assembly": Matrosindus, Matrinus, Matroi
 maur- (later mour-), possibly to PGmc *mauraz "ant" or Latin maurus "Moor": Mauran, Maurentan, Maurican, Mauron
 medum- (later meom-), to PGmc *medumaz "middling, moderate": Meduma
 mer-, mir-, mar-, to PGmc *mērjaz "famous": Margilli, Merila, Meroildi, Mervigius, Mira, Mirella, Mirellus, Miro, Mirosinda, Mirualdo
 mod-, mud-, to PGmc *mōdaz "anger, wrath": Modericus, Moderido, Modildus, Modilli, Mudario, Mudila
 mun-, mon-, to PGmc *muniz "thought": Monefonsus, Monobredo, Munisclus
 mund-, mond-, to PGmc *mundō "protection": Monderico, Mondoi, Mundellus, Mundila, Mundildus, Mundinus, Mundus
 nand-, nant-, to PGmc *nanþaz "bold, courageous": Nandamundus, Nandaricus, Nandinus, Nandoi, Nandulfo, Nandus, Nantemiro, Nantildo
 naust-, to PGmc *naustą "a ship-shed, boathouse": Naustus, Naustila
 neu-, nu-, to PGmc *neujaz "new": Nuilla, Nuillo, Neufila
 nit-, to PGmc *nīþaz "hatred" or *niþjaz "kinsman": Nitigisius
 not-, to PGmc *nauthiz "need": Notarius
 of-, to PGmc *ubjōn "abundance": Offa, Ofila, Offilo
 old-, to PGmc *hulþaz "kind, clement": Olda, Oldaricus
 opp-, possibly to PGmc *ōbjanan "to celebrate solemnly" (related to Latin opus "work"): Oppa, Oppila
 osd-, to PGmc *huzdan "treasure": Osdulfus
 pant-, to PGmc *pandan "pledge" or *banti "district": Pantardus, Panto, Pantinus
 pap-, pep- no clear etymology; possibly to PGmc *pipo "A pipe or flute; a wind instrument." or Latin pāpiliō "butterfly, moth": Papellus, Papitus, Pappinus, Pappo, Pepi, Pipericus, Pipinus
 penn-, pen- possibly to Latin penna "feather": Penetrudia, Penus, Pennino
 rad-, rat-, to PGmc *rēdaz "advice": Rademirus, Rademundus, Radesindus, Radulfus, Ratario, Retericus
 ragi-, ragn- (later rei-), to PGmc *raginą "advice, decision": Ragesenda, Ragesindus, Ragian, Ragifredo, Ragimiru, Ragito, Ragolfus, Raiola, Raiolo, Reginaldus, Reimondus, Reirigus
 rak-, to PGmc *rakan "reason, talk" or *wrakaz "pursuer": Rakericus
 ram-, to PGmc *rammaz "strong; ram": Ramila, Ramon, Ramulo
 rana-, rani- (later ra-), probably to PGmc *rannjanan "to run": Ranarius, Ranemira, Ranemirus, Ranemundus, Ranilo, Ranisclus, Raniverga, Raniverta, Ranivertus, Ranosenda, Ranosindus, Ranualdus, Ranulfus
 rand-, rant-, to PGmc *randaz "shield": Randemirus, Randili, Randinus, Rando, Randuarius, Randulfus, Rendericus
 raup-, to PGmc *raupjanan "to plunder, to spoil": Rauparius
 rec-, req-, ric-, to PGmc *rīkjaz "mighty, noble": Recaredus, Reccafredus, Recebrida, Recedrudia, Recelli, Recemera, Recemirus, Recemundus, Recesenda, Recesindus, Recesuinda, Recesuindus, Rechiarius, Recilli, Requilli, Recinus, Recualdus, Regaulfus, Reicionda, Rekeritus, Requefonsus, Rezevera, Ricardo, Riquila, Riquilo, Riquilodo, Riquoi
 ref-, to PGmc *hrabnaz "crow": Refulfo
 rem-, to PGmc *remez "rest, calmness": Remegildus, Remesario, Remesilli, Remesindus, Remestro, Remismundus, Remisol, Rimionda
 rest-, to PGmc *ristiz "rising up": Restericus
 rod-, rud-, to PGmc *hrōþaz "fame": Rodemirus, Rodevertus, Rodosildi, Rodougus, Roelindus, Rouvredo, Rudericus, Rudesindus, Rudila, Rudilo
 rom-, rum-, to PGmc *hrōmaz "fame": Romarigus, Romila, Rumario
 sala- (later sa-), to PGmc *salaz 'hall, dwelling': Salamirus, Salamarus, Salla
 sand-, sant-, to PGmc *sanþaz "truth, justice": Sandinus, Sando, Santimirus
 sar-, to PGmc *sarwan "arm, armament": Saroi, Saruilli
 sax- (later seix-), to PGmc *sahsan "knife" and *sahxōn "Saxon": Saxo, Seixomir
 scap-, to PGmc *skapan "vessel": Scapa
 scarc-, to PGmc *skalkaz "servant; sword": Scarcila
 scer-, to PGmc *skīriz "pure": Scerinus
 sed-, to PGmc *seduz "custom": Sedino
 sedeg-, to PGmc *sedīgaz "well-bred, well-behaved": Sedeges
 seg-, sag-, sig- (later se-, si-), to PGmc *segez "victory": Sagatus, Sagildo, Sagulfus, Segemundus, Segesindo, Segestro, Segga, Segika, Segimarus, Segioi, Segomirus, Seguinus, Sigeberto, Sigefrida, Sigeredus, Sigericus, Sigesgundia, Sigesinda, Sigila, Sigu, Segio
 sel-, to PGmc *sēliz "good, kind": Selmirus, Seloi
 selv-, to PGmc *selbaz "self": Selvas, Selvatus
 sen-, sin-, to PGmc *senaz "ever, old": Senatrudia, Seniberta, Senildi, Senuita, Senuldo, Sinerta, Sinifredus
 send-, sent-, to PGmc *senþaz "companion" or *swenþaz "strong": Senda, Sendamirus, Sendello, Sendericus, Senderiga, Sendina, Sendinus, Sendoi, Sendon, Sendredus, Senduitu, Sendulfus, Senta, Sentarius, Sindamundus, Sindi, Sindigis, Sindila, Sindileuba, Sindilo, Sindiverga, Sindo, Sinduara
 ser-, to PGmc *swēraz "valued, honoured": Seririgo, Serulfus, Servaldus
 sigunt-, to PGmc *sebunþōn "seventh": Sigunterigo
 sis-, ses-, possibly related to Old High German sisu "funerary song, ritual": Sescutus, Sesericus, Sesina, Sesmiro, Sesmundo, Sesoi, Sesuito, Sisa, Sisebutus, Sisegundia, Sisellus, Sisildus, Sisileova, Sisilli, Sisilu, Sisinus, Sisiverta, Sisiverto, Sisivigia, Sisnandus, Sisualdo, Sisuita, Sisuldus, Sisulfus, Zisila
 sit-, to PGmc *setan "seat": Sitagellus, Siti, Sitividis
 smer-, to PGmc *smerwōn "fat": Smerlo
 sontr-, suntr-, to PGmc *sunþrjaz "southern": Sontrilli, Suntria
 span-, to PGmc *spananan "to lead": Spanaricu, Spanarius, Spanilo, Spanosendo, Spanubrida
 spand-, possibly to *spannanan "to join": Spandaricus
 spar-, to PGmc *sparwaz "sparrow": Espallo, Sparuildi
 speraut-, to PGmc *spreutanan "to sprout": Sperautan
 spint-, to PGmc *spenþa "fat": Spintilo, Spintino
 spod- (later espo-), possibly to PGmc *spōdiz "prosperity, success": Spodemiro, Spoderigo
 stan-, to PGmc *stainaz "stone": Stanildi
 stod-, possibly to PGmc *stōdą "a herd of horses": Stodildi
 strouc-, to PGmc *streukanan "to stroke": Strouco
 suab-, sab-, sav-, sev-, to PGmc *swēbaz "Suebian": Sabaredus, Sabegoto, Sabila, Sabita, Sabitus, Savaracus, Savaricus, Savegodus, Savildi, Savoy, Sevegildo, Suabas, Suavar
 sue-, to PGmc *swe- "own": Sueredus, Suimirus
 sund-, sunt-, to PGmc *sunþiz "south": Sundemirus, Suntarius
 suni-, seni-, sani-, soni-, to PGmc *sunjō "truth": Sanigia, Seniaredus, Seniulfus, Sonegildus, Songimera, Soniaricus, Sonifreda, Sonita, Suniagisclus, Suniarius, Suniemirus, Sunila, Sunildi, Sunilo, Sunitus
 sunn-, to PGmc *sunnan "sun": Sonna
 tanc-, to PGmc *þankaz "favor, grace": Tancila, Tancinus, Tancus, Tanquilli
 tanth-, to PGmc *tanþz "tooth": Tandus
 tat-, zaz-, to PGmc *taitaz "radiant; bright": Tata, Tatina, Zazitus, Zazo
 teg-, to PGmc *þegnaz "thane, freeman": Tegila, Tegino, Tegio, Tegitus
 teq-, possibly to PGmc *tēkaną "to touch, to grasp" or *tehwō "order, array" via alteration of H to K: Tequilo, Texilli
 teud-, teod-, tod-, ted- (later teo-), to PGmc *þeudō "nation" and *þeudanaz "king": Teadario, Tederona, Tedoy, Teobaldus, Teoda, Teodefredo, Teodegildo, Teodegondia, Teodemirus, Teodemundus, Teodenandus, Teoderados, Teoderago, Teoderedus, Teodericus, Teodesinda, Teodesindus, Teodeverga, Teodiberta, Teodila, Teodildi, Teodilo, Teodinus, Teodisclus, Teodiu, Teodoriga, Teodulfus, Teton, Teudecutus, Teudisila, Theodivertus, Tiotevadus, Todegia, Todegogia, Toduldo, Tota, Tudiscaisum
 tit-, tet-, to PGmc *taitōn "little boy": Tetina, Titila
 tors-, turis-,  to PGmc *þursaz "giant": Torsario, Turisulfus
 trad-, to PGmc þrēdaz "quick": Tradus, Tradinus
 tras-, to PGmc *þrasō "move, fight": Tracinus, Trasaricus, Trasarius, Trasavara, Trasendus, Trasido, Trasilli, Trasiuadus, Trasmira, Trasmiro, Trasmondo, Trasoi, Trassemutus, Trasuarius, Trasuinda, Trasulfus
 trast-, to PGmc *traustaz "strong": Trastalo, Trastelus, Trastemiro, Trastidia, Trastina, Trastulfus, Trastivigia
 trevu-, to PGmc *trewwaz "faithful": Trevuleus
 truct- (later troit-) to *druhtiz "people, army" and druhtīnaz "lord, master": Tructinus, Tructa, Tructemiro, Tructemondo, Tructericus, Tructesinda, Tructesindus, Tructilli, Tructus, Truitellus, Truitero
 trud-, to PGmc *drūdaz "friend, beloved": Truda, Trudigildus, Trudildi, Trudilo, Trudina, Trudinus, Trudulfus
 tund-, tunt-, to PGmc *tunþuz "tooth": Tumtuldo, Tundulfus, Tuntila
 un-, on-, to PGmc *hūnaz "cub" and "Hun": Uniscus, Unisco, Onaredus, Onegilda, Onegildo, Onemirus, Onesindus, Onildi, Unilli, Onoricus, Onosinda, Unemundus, Unileus, Unilla
 vad-, guad- (later gua-, ga-), to PGmc *wadaz "ford": Guadla, Uaduuara, Vadamundus, Vademirus
 vala-, guala-, quala-, to PGmc *walaz "the slain, battlefield" or *walhaz "Celt": Gualamarius, Gualamira, Gualamirus, Qualatrudia, Qualavara, Valarius
 vamb-, to PGmc *wambō "belly": Vamba
 vand-, guand-, to PGmc *wanduz "wand, rod": Guanadildi, Guandila, Guandilo, Guantaldus, Vandino, Vuanda
 ven-, guin-, to PGmc *weniz "friend": Guina, Guinilli, Uenildi, Guinus
 venet-, guend-, vened-, genit-, to PGmc *wenedaz "Vendian, Slav": Genitigia, Guendo, Venedario, Venetricus
 ver-, to PGmc *wērō "pledge; true": Vera, Vermundus, Veremudus
 via-, possibly to PGmc *wīhan "temple": Viaricus, Viamundus
 vidr-, vedr-, quitr-,  to PGmc *wiþra "against": Quitre, Vederoi, Vedragese, Vedrailli, Vidragildus, Vidraldus, Vidramirus
 vidub-, to PGmc *widuwaz "widowed": Vidubas
 vig-, veg-, to PGmc *wīgaz "fighter": Uegitus, Vigila, Vigilli, Vigilo, Vigiltu, Vigoy
 vil-, guil-, quil-, to PGmc *weljōn "will": Guiliberto, Quella, Uiliaredus, Uilloi, Gilloi, Vilesinda, Viliamirus, Vilian, Viliaricu, Viliarius, Viliatus, Viliefredus, Vilifonsus, Viligus, Vilitro, Viliulfus, Vilivado, Villavaria, Villelmus, Villisendo, Villo
 vim- to PGmc *wīgą "fight, battle": Guimarigus, Uimaredus, Viman, Vimara
 vinc-, to PGmc *wenkjanan "to move sideways, to avoid": Venze, Vincila
 vis-, ius-, to PGmc *wesuz "good": Iusuandus, Uisulfus, Usegildus, Visaldus, Visaridus, Visellu
 visand-, to PGmc *wisundaz "bison": Visandus
 vist-, iust-, to PGmc *westan "west": Iusterigo, Iustiarius, Iustila, Vistemundo, Vistesinda, Iustesenda, Vistiberga, Vistisclo, Vistivara, Wistiz
 vistr-, iustr-, to PGmc *westraz "westward": Iustri, Uistrello, Uistrileuba, Vestregoti, Visterla, Visterlo, Vistragildus, Vistramundi, Vistraricus, Vistrarius, Vistravara, Vistravarius, Vistregia, Vistremiro, Vistresindus, Vistrevius, Vistrildi, Vistresilli, Vistroi
 vit- (later vid-), to PGmc *witan "knowledge": Uita, Vidila, Vitinus, Vitisclus
 vitt-, vict (later vit-), to PGmc *witjan "comprehension": Uiti, Uittina, Victemirus, Victericus, Vitarius, Vitas, Vitila, Vitildus, Vitiza, Vittimero
 viv, oyv-, to PGmc *wīban "wife, woman": Oyeuio, Vivildus
 viz-, quiz-, unclear etymology, the alteration of v to qu suggests that the original word started with an hw- cluster, possibly to PGmc *hwis "to hiss, to rush, make a rushing sound": Quizino, Viza, Vizamundus, Vizila, Vizoi

Feminine roots 
Elements common as the second syllable of feminine names include:
 -berta, -verta, PGmc *berhtō "bright": Aliverta, Raniverta, Sisiverta, Teodiverta
 -berga, -verga, PGmc *bergō "shelter": Aliverga, Astriverga, Gundiverga, Ildiverga, Kindiverga, Raniverga, Sindiverga, Teodeverga, Viscaverga, Vistiberga
 -drudia/-trudia (later -druia), PGmc *drūd-jō "friend, beloved": Alatrudia, Aniedrudia, Ansetrudia, Dagadrudia, Entrudi, Ermedrudia, Guntedrudia, Penetrudia, Qualatrudia, Recedrudia, Senatrudia
 -fara, PGmc *farō "journey": Ermefara
 -freda/-breda/-brida/-vrida, PGmc *friþ-ō "peace": Alifreda, Alobrida, Ansobrida, Belavrida, Genobreda, Gundebrida, Mectubrida, Recebrida, Sigefrida, Sonifreda, Spanubrida
 -fonsa, PGmc *funs-ō "eager, ready": Argifonsa
 -go, PGmc *gauj-ō "region, district": Ermego
 -geba/-geva (later -eva), PGmc *gebō "gift": Argeva, Frogeva, Gudigeba, Gundigeva
 -gelda, PGmc *geld-ō "reward": Kagilda, Onegilda
 -isila, -gīsl-ō "hostage, sprout": Teudisila
 -goto/-godo, PGmc *gaut-ō "Goth woman": Astrogoto, Ermegoto, Goldregodo, Leovegoto, Sabegoto, Vestregoti
 -cuntia/-cundia/-guntia/-gundia/-gunza/-onda, PGmc *gunþ-jō "fight": Adegundia, Alaguntia, Ansiunda, Aragunti, Astragundia, Bergundi, Ebragundia, Eigonza, Eldegundia, Ermegundia, Fradegundia, Helaguntia, Ildoncia, Leodegundia, Menegundia, Reicionda, Rimionda, Sigesgundia, Siseguntia, Teodogoncia, Treitegundia
 -ildi, -illi, PGmc *heldiz "battle": Abronilli, Amalilli, Ansuildi, Argenilli, Aruildi, Astruildi, Aurilli, Barsilli, Barilli, Berildi, Berosildi, Bonilde, Brunildi, Desteilli, Donadildi, Ebrildi, Ebrailli, Ermildi, Framilli, Fremosilli, Frogildi, Fronildi, Fronosili, Frumildi, Ganilli, Gasuildi, Gaudilli, Genildi, Ionilde, Getilli, Gogilli, Guanadildi, Guananildi, Guinilli, Uenildi, Guntilli, Gundesilli, Gutilli, Ibilli, Leovilli, Manildi, Manusildi, Margilli, Meitilli, Meroildi, Modilli, Onildi, Unilli, Randili, Recilli, Requilli, Remesilli, Rodosildi, Saruilli, Sarilli, Savildi, Senildi, Sisilli, Sontrilli, Sparuildi, Stanildi, Stodildi, Sunildi, Tanquilli, Tenildi, Teodildi, Texilli, Trasilli, Trasuildi, Tructilli, Trudildi, Vedrailli, Vergilli, Vigilli, Vistrildi, Vistresilli
 -leuba, -leova, PGmc *leub-ō "beloved": Adileova, Ansileova, Argileuva, Asileva, Astileuva, Eileuva, Ermileuva, Froiloba, Gudileuva, Manileuva, Sindileuba, Sisileova, Uistrileuba
 -mira, -mera, PGmc *mēr-ō "famous, excellent": Gesmira, Germira, Giudimira, Gualamira, Ketemera, Ranemira, Recemera, Songimera, Trasmira
 -nanda (later -anda), PGmc *nanþ-ō "bold, courageous": Fredenanda, Gadenanda, Godenanda, Gondenanda
 -rica (later -riga), PGmc *rīk-ō "ruler": Odorica, Senderiga, Teodoriga
 -rotis, PGmc *rōt-iz "glad, cheerful": Gunterotis
 -rona, PGmc *rūnō "mystery, secret": Gunderona, Leoverona, Tederona
 -senda, -sinda, PGmc *senþ-ō "companion" or *swenþ-ō "strong": Adosinda, Arosinda, Audesinda, Bertosinda, Cenusenda, Eldesinda, Ermesinda, Eudisinda, Fredesinda, Froisenda, Fromosinda, Godesinda, Guisenda, Goysenda, Leovesenda, Manosenda, Mirosinda, Obstrisinda, Onosinda, Orosinda, Peruisenda, Ragesenda, Ranosenda, Recesenda, Sigesinda, Teodesinda, Tructesinda, Vilesinda, Vistesinda, Iustesenda
 -suenda, -suinda, PGmc *swenþ-ō "strong": Recesuinda, Trasuinda
 -vara, PGmc *warō "care, attention; possession": Astruara, Bertuara, Ilduara, Mansuara, Qualavara, Rezevera, Sinduara, Trasavara, Uaduuara, Visclavara, Villavaria, Vistivara, Vistravara
 -vera, PGmc *wērō "pledge, plight": Gelvira, Gundivera
 -vigia, -igia, PGmc *wīg-jō "fighter": Genitigia, Godoigia, Guntuigia, Sanigia, Sisivigia, Trastivigia, Vistregia
 -vita, -vidis, probably related to PGmc *witjan "knowledge, comprehension": :Senuita, Sisuita, Sitividis

Suffixes used to derive hypocoristic feminine names include:  
 -alo: Facalo, Trastalo
 -ilo (later -io): Acilo, Andilo, Anilo, Ansilo, Ardilo, Argilo, Berilo, Bitilo, Cisilo, Dadilo, Egilo, Ailo, Emilo, Esmerlo, Espallo, Fagilo, Faquilo, Frankilo, Froilo, Frunilo, Genilo, Genlo, Geodilo, Gracilo, Granilo, Guandilo, Gudilo, Gundilo, Gutilo, Itilo, Liuvilo, Nisilo, Nuillo, Nunnilo, Quintilo, Ranilo, Riquilo, Rudilo, Sindilo, Sisilu, Spanilo, Spintilo, Sunilo, Tafila, Teodilo, Tequilo, Trudilo, Vigilo, Visterlo
 -ina: Bagina, Baquina, Berina, Fandina, Frogina, Gavina, Gendina, Getina, Gogina, Guntina, Gutina, Lallina, Nunnina, Sendina, Sesina, Tanina, Tidina, Tetina, Trastina, Trudina, Vergina, Zanina
 -ita (later -ida): Acita, Cagita, Farita, Gomita, Nunnita, Sabita, Sonita
 -ella: Farella, Gondella, Mirella, Nunella

Masculine roots 
Elements common as the second syllable of masculine names include:
 -badus, -vadus, PGmc *badwō "fight": Argevadus, Gisvado, Gundivadus, Tiotevadus, Trasiuadus, Vilivado
 -baldus, -valdus, PGmc *balþaz "bold": Gundivaldo, Teobaldus
 -bertus, -vertus, PGmc *berhtaz "bright": Alivertus, Ansvertus, Argeberto, Audibertus, Eldivertus, Filivertus, Fridiverto, Geodevertus, Gidiberto, Gugivertus, Guiliberto, Idiverto, Leoverto, Ranivertus, Rodevertus, Sigeberto, Sisiverto, Theodivertus
 -butus, PGmc *bōtō "profit, usefulness": Sisebutus
 -fredus, -fridus, -bredus, -vredus (later -vreu), PGmc *friþuz "peace": Alliefredus, Argifredus, Audofredo, Erdebredo, Ermefredo, Geodefredo, Gisovredus, Godefredus, Gundebredo, Ildebredus, Leodefredus, Monobredo, Osobredus, Ostrofredo, Ragifredo, Reccafredus, Rouvredo, Sinifredus, Teodefredo, Viliefredus, Visclafredo
 -funsus, -fonsus, -bonsus, PGmc *funsaz "eager, ready": Adefonsus, Andifonso, Argefonsus, Belfonsus, Erifonsus, Ildefonsus, Monefonsus, Requefonsus, Vilifonsus
  -fortis, probably Latin fortis "strong": Gundifortis
 -gis, -ges, -geses, -garius, PGmc *gaizaz "spear": Adeqisio, Astragis, Eldegeses, Ermegis, Felgirus, Gudegisus, Heremigarium, Leodegisius, Nitigisius, Sindigis, Tudiscaisum, Vedragese
 -gaster, -bastus, PGmc *gastiz "guest": Adegaster, Albiaster, Algaster, Ardabastus, Argivastro, Donagastro, Leodegasti
 -gotus, -godus, PGmc *gautaz "Goth": Eldegotus, Ermegotus, Leubegutus, Savegodus, Sescutus, Teudecutus, Visigotus
 -gogia, PGmc *gaujan "district": Todegogia
 -gildus, -ildus, PGmc *geld-az "reward": Anagildus, Aquisildus, Atanagildus, Cagildo, Daildus, Donegildus, Egildus, Agildus, Engildus, Ermegildus, Fagildus, Falgildus, Fredilli, Fromildus, Frugildus, Gaudilti, Geodegildus, Goldegildo, Leovegildus, Megildus, Modildus, Mundildus, Nantildo, Onegildo, Pabregildus, Pederagildu, Remegildus, Sagildo, Sevegildo, Sisildus, Sitagellus, Sonegildus, Tarildus, Teodegildo, Tudeildus, Trenelldus, Trudigildus, Uanagildi, Usegildus, Vidragildus, Vigiltu, Vistragildus, Vitildus, Vivildus
 -gisclus, -isclus, to -gīslaz "hostage, sprout": Fredisclus, Guntiesclo, Hermecisclus, Indisclus, Iuuisclus, Kedisilo, Munisclus, Odisclus, Ranisclus, Suniagisclus, Teodisclus, Vistisclo, Vitisclus
 -ardus, PGmc *harduz "hard": Ianardo, Pantardus, Ricardo
 -arius (later -eiro), PGmc *harjaz "army, host": Adarius, Agarius, Alarius, Amedeiro, Andiarius, Ascarius, Atarius, Aunarius, Baltarius, Bazarius, Belesarius, Bertarius, Cufarius, Donazarius, Ermiarius, Fredario, Frumarius, Gaifarius, Gitarius, Gualdarius, Guldarius, Gulfarius, Gumarius, Gundarius, Iubarius, Iustiarius, Leodarius, Lotarius, Magnarius, Mudario, Notarius, Olcarius, Quitarius, Ranarius, Ratario, Rauparius, Rechiarius, Remesario, Rumario, Sentarius, Spanarius, Suavarius, Suniarius, Suntarius, Teadario, Torsario, Trasarius, Truitero, Uandalarius, Valarius, Venedario, Viliarius, Visclario, Vistrarius, Vitarius
 -atus (later -ado), PGmc *haþuz "war": Alvatus, Andeatus, Astratus, Eugienadus, Ganati, Gomadus, Guanatus, Guntato, Iuvatus, Sagatus, Selvatus, Viliatus
 -elmus, PGmc *helmaz "helm": Villelmus
 -leus, PGmc *hlewaz "renown": Eilleus, Trevuleus, Unileus
 -ramnus, PGmc *hrabnaz "crow": Gunderamnus
 -ringus, -lenco, PGmc *hrengaz "ring": Froaringus, Fralenko
 -licus, PGmc *laikaz "dance, game, battle": Ivolicus
 -lindus, PGmc *lenþaz "gentle, mild": Ermelindus, Roelindus, Teodelindus
 -leobo, -levo, PGmc *leubaz "dear": Adileobo, Andilevo
 -marius, -marus (later -meiro), PGmc mērjaz "great, famous": Ansemarus, Astremarus, Baldemarius, Gresumarus, Gualamarius, Gundemarus, Gutumarus, Leudemarus, Salamarus, Segimarus, Zamarius
 -madus, PGmc *maþ- "good": Agimadus
 -mirus, -mero, PGmc *mērjaz "famous, excellent": Acimiro, Adimirus, Agromirus, Alamiro, Aldemirus, Ansemirus, Antemirus, Ariamiro, Argemirus, Artemiro, Aumiro, Bademirus, Baldemirus, Baudemirus, Belmirus, Bertamirus, Bonimiro, Cartemiro, Caudemirus, Cendamiro, Crescemirus, Crodemirus, Dacamiro, Damiro, Docemiro, Dulcemirus, Eimirus, Eldemirus, Engomirus, Ermemirus, Felmiro, Framiro, Francemirus, Franomiro, Fredemiro, Frumirus, Gademiro, Geldemirus, Gelmiro, Geodemirus, Gesmiro, Godemiro, Gualamirus, Guimirus, Guldremirus, Gulfemirus, Guntemirus, Gutemirus, Karmirus, Leodemiro, Leomirus, Nantemiro, Odamirus, Onemirus, Ostromirus, Astromirus, Estromirus, Quidemirus, Rademirus, Ragimiru, Randemirus, Ranemirus, Recemirus, Rodemirus, Salamirus, Santimirus, Saxomirus, Segomirus, Selmirus, Sendamirus, Sesmiro, Spodemirus, Suimirus, Sulfemirus, Sundemirus, Suniemirus, Teodemirus, Trasmiro, Trastemiro, Tructemiro, Vademirus, Victemirus, Vidramirus, Viliamirus, Visclamirus, Vistremiro, Vittimero
 -modus, PGmc *mōdaz "courage, anger, wrath": Trassemutus, Vermudus
 -mundus (later -mondo), *mundaz "protection, guardianship": Ansemondus, Argemondo, Arumundo, Asemondus, Astramondus, Atalamondo, Badamundus, Camundus, Damondus, Dolcemondus, Eldemundus, Fredamundus, Gemundus, Geodemondo, Gismundus, Germundus, Godomundus, Gomundus, Gontemondus, Goymundus, Guimundus, Gutemondo, Hermundus, Itimondo, Keremondus, Leodemundo, Nandamundus, Odemundus, Olemundus, Rademundus, Ranemundus, Recemundus, Reimondus, Remismundus, Rosamundus, Segemundus, Sesmundo, Sindamundus, Teodemundus, Trasmondo, Tructemondo, Unemundus, Vadamundus, Viamundus, Visclamundus, Vistemundo, Vistramundi, Vizamundus, Zamondo
 -nandus (later -ando), PGmc *nanþ-az "bold, courageous": Bretenandus, Ermenandus, Euvenandus, Fredenandus, Gudenandus, Ketenando, Reinantus, Riquinandus, Sisnandus, Teodenandus, Vittinandus
 -redus, -radus, -ridus (later -reu), PGmc *rēdaz "advice": Aderedus, Alderedus, Anseredo, Argeredus, Asoredus, Astredo, Balderedo, Dagaredus, Egeredus, Enaredus, Engoredus, Evorido, Falderedo, Fateredus, Fraredus, Fulcaredus, Goldredo, Gomaredus, Guderedus, Gunderedo, Kenderedus, Leoveredus, Malaredus, Moderido, Onaredus, Osoredo, Provaredo, Recaredus, Sabaredus, Sendredus, Seniaredus, Sigeredus, Sueredus, Teoderedus, Uiliaredus, Uimaredus, Visaridus
 -ricus (later -rigo), PGmc *rīkz "ruler, lord": Accaricus, Aderico, Alaricus, Aldericus, Aliaricus, Alvaricus, Andericus, Ansericus, Ardericus, Argericus, Ascarigus, Asparigus, Asterigo, Atanaricus, Atericus, Balderico, Betericus, Bliviaricus, Brandericus, Censerigus, Iensericus, Coniaricus, Desterigus, Domerigo, Eburicus, Eimericus, Eirigu, Elperico, Engorigus, Ermericus, Fredericus, Fromaricus, Fruaricus, Gauderigus, Geserigus, Getericus, Gildaricus, Golfarico, Gomarigus, Guderigo, Guimarigus, Guiricus, Gulderigus, Gunderigus, Ilderigus, Ionarico, Iusterigo, Iuvericus, Leoderigus, Leoverigus, Magnaricus, Malaricus, Matericus, Modericus, Monderico, Nandaricus, Odericus, Onoricus, Osorico, Ausarigus, Pipericus, Quidericus, Rakericus, Reirigus, Rendericus, Restericus, Retericus, Romarigus, Rudericus, Savaricus, Sendericus, Seririgo, Sesericus, Sigericus, Sigunterigo, Soniaricus, Spanaricu, Spandaricus, Spoderigo, Teodericus, Trasaricus, Tructericus, Turpericus, Venetricus, Vendericus, Genitrigus, Viaricus, Victericus, Viliaricu, Vistraricus
 -racus (later -rago), PGmc *rakaz "straight": Savaracus, Teoderago
 -rote, PGmc *rōtaz "glad": Ermerote
 -sendus, -sindus, PGmc *senþaz "companion" or *swenþaz "strong": Adelasindo, Adesindus, Andosindus, Ardesendus, Argesindus, Arosindus, Auresindus, Ausendus, Badosindus, Bagesindus, Becosindo, Baldesindo, Baudesindus, Berosindus, Bonesindus, Eisindus, Eldesindus, Ermosindus, Evosindo, Floresindus, Fortesindus, Fredosindus, Froisendus, Fromosindus, Gaudesindo, Geodesindus, Gitesindus, Gomesindo, Gotesendus, Gudesindus, Guisindus, Gundesindus, Leodesindo, Leovesindus, Manosindus, Marcosendus, Onesindus, Quedesendo, Kedesendo, Radesindus, Ragesindus, Ranosindus, Recesindus, Remesindus, Rudesindus, Segesindo, Spanosendo, Storesindo, Teodesindus, Trasendus, Tructesindus, Villisendo, Vistresindus, Zendasindo
 -scalcus, PGmc *skalkaz "servant": Gundiscalcus
 -suendo, -suindo, PGmc *swenþaz "strong": Reccesuindus
 -teus, -deus, -dius, PGmc *þewaz "servant": Ansedeus, Arnadius, Engladius, Filisteus, Gudesteus
 -ualdus, -aldus, -gualdus, -allo, PGmc *waldaz "ruler, mighty": Ansuallo, Anualdus, Ardaldus, Arnaldus, Arualdus, Astualdu, Avaldus, Barvaldus, Bernaldus, Bidualdus, Ensaldus, Ermaldus, Fredoaldus, Fromaldus, Giraldus, Gomaldo, Gontualdo, Grimaldus, Guantaldus, Leovaldo, Manualdus, Mirualdo, Otualdo, Ranualdus, Recualdus, Reginaldus, Servaldus, Sisualdo, Trasoldi, Vidraldus, Visaldus
 -uarius, -oarius, PGmc *warjaz "inhabitant, defender": Alduarius, Ansuario, Astruario, Freduarius, Oduarius, Osoarius, Randuarius, Trasuarius, Vistravarius
 -oindus, PGmc *wendaz "wind": Aloindo, Eindu, Fredoindus
 -oynus, PGmc *weniz "friend": Odoynus
 -uerco, related to PGmc *werkan "work": Aliverko, Eldivercus
 -uigio, -uigus, PGmc *wīgaz "fighter": Audugus, Baldoigius, Eldoigius, Ermoygius, Eroigius, Erigio, Guntigio, Leodeuigus, Mervigius, Rodougus, Viligus, Vistrevius
 -oytus, -vitus, probably related to PGmc *witōn "wise": Aldroitus, Aloitus, Argevitus, Senduitu, Sesuito
 -ulfus, -gulfus, PGmc *wulfaz "wolf": Adaulfus, Ataulfus, Agiulfus, Agrivulfum, Aliulfus, Andulfus, Ansiulphus, Anulfo, Ardulfus, Ariulfus, Arnulfo, Asarulfo, Asculfo, Asiulfus, Astrulfus, Astulfus, Aulfus, Berulfus, Betrulfus, Brandiulfus, Ebregulfus, Endulfus, Ermulfo, Eruulfus, Fardulfus, Fradiulfus, Fredulfus, Fregulfus, Frogiulfo, Gandulfo, Gardulfus, Gaulfus, Geodulfus, Gesulfus, Ierulfus, Gigulfo, Gomulfus, Gresulfo, Gudilulfo, Gundulfo, Ildulfus, Kendulfus, Leodulfus, Mandulfo, Maniulfus, Manulfus, Meitulfus, Nandulfo, Osdulfus, Quedulfus, Radulfus, Ragolfus, Randulfus, Ranulfus, Refulfo, Regaulfus, Sagulfus, Sendulfus, Seniulfus, Serulfus, Sisulfus, Teodulfus, Trastulfus, Trasulfus, Trudulfus, Tundulfus, Turisulfus, Uisulfus, Venariufi, Viliulfus
 -uldus, -guldus, PGmc *wulþuz "splendor": Arebuldo, Atauldus, Ebreguldus, Framuldo, Frineguldus, Fronuldo, Gebuldus, Itaultus, Senuldo, Sisuldus, Toduldo, Tumtuldo

Suffixes used to derive hypocoristic masculine names are:
 -eca, -ica (later -ega): Abrecan, Adica, Audeca, Begica, Egica, Elleca, Gagica, Segika
 -ila (later -ia): Adila, Andila, Anila, Ansila, Attila, Audila, Azilane, Badila, Baldila, Becilla, Bergila, Berila, Blandila, Brandila, Butila, Cixila, Crizila, Cutella, Dadila, Danila, Ducila, Egila, Agila, Emila, Ermila, Fafila, Fafia, Fagila, Fandila, Favila, Fradila, Framila, Frankila, Froila, Gandila, Gaudilani, Gavila, Gladila, Gramila, Guadla, Guandila, Gudila, Gulfila, Gumila, Gundila, Ikila, Itila, Iudila, Iustila, Iuvila, Keila, Kinquila, Ledla, Lubila, Magila, Manilla, Mantila, Martila, Massila, Mellilla, Merila, Mudila, Mugila, Mumila, Mundila, Naustila, Nuilla, Neufila, Nunnila, Ofila, Oila, Opila, Ossila, Quintila, Ramila, Riquila, Romila, Rudila, Sabila, Scarcila, Sigila, Sindila, Sunila, Tancila, Tegila, Teodila, Titila, Tuntila, Unilla, Vertila, Vidila, Vigila, Vincila, Visterla, Vitila, Vizila, Zisila
 -inus (later -ino): Addalinus, Aldinus, Bagino, Baltino, Baquino, Batinus, Berinus, Bertinus, Blandinus, Boninus, Brandinus, Cartinus, Crescino, Dadinus, Dalinus, Eldinus, Evorinus, Fandinus, Farino, Favino, Fofino, Fonsinus, Fruginus, Frauino, Gandinus, Gaudinas, Gavinus, Gentino, Gendinus, Golinus, Guginus, Gulfinus, Gultinus, Guntinus, Gutinus, Haginus, Hamdino, Iubinus, Karinus, Lallinus, Lelino, Lubinus, Mandinus, Maninus, Matlinus, Muginus, Mundinus, Nandinus, Naninus, Nunninus, Odinus, Audinus, Pantinus, Pappinus, Pennino, Pipinus, Quizino, Randinus, Recinus, Sandinus, Scerinus, Sedino, Sendinus, Sisinus, Spintino, Suffini, Tancinus, Tanino, Tatina, Tetina, Tegino, Teodinus, Tracinus, Tradinus, Tructinus, Trudinus, Uittina, Uittinus, Vandino, Goandinus, Vitinus, Zanino
 -linus, -llinus: Abbelino, Adolinus, Francolino, Gundelinus, Iovellinus
 -itus (later -ido): Cagitus, Carito, Crescitu, Donnitus, Froritum, Ganiti, Gegitus, Gogitus, Gumito, Guncitus, Iuvitus, Magitus, Magnitus, Manitus, Marcitus, Maxitus, Nannitus, Nonnitu, Papitus, Pegito, Pinnitus, Ragito, Sabitus, Sunitus, Sonnito, Tanitus, Atanitus, Tegitus, Trasido, Uegitus, Zanitus, Zazitus, Zenzitus 
 -ellus (later -elo): Betellus, Felellus, Francellus, Froiellus, Frumellus, Gigelus, Gumellus, Guntellus, Gutellus, Hermellus, Lubellus, Mannello, Mantellus, Mirellus, Mundellus, Nonellus, Papellus, Recelli, Sendello, Sisellus, Trastelus, Truitellus, Uistrello, Visellu, Zanellus

Superlative and comparative suffixes were also used in forming personal names:
-iza: Boniza, Wittiza
-istaz: Ariastre, Belestrio, Fromesta, Remestro, Segestro

Other suffixes imply origin or relationship:
 -ingaz: Amingus, Bellengus, Gardingus
 -iskaz: Vandaliscus "Vandal" (male), Huniscus "Hun" (male)
 -iskō: Hunisco "Hun" (female)

Toponyms 
Many of these names are also toponyms (towns, parishes, villages, hamlets and fields), usually in the form of a Latin or Germanic genitive of the owner's name and sometimes preceded by the type of property (a Portuguese-Galician word of Latin, Germanic or pre-Latin origin) such as vila (villa, palace, estate), vilar (hamlet) castro (castle), casa (house), porta (pass, ford), agro (field), sa (Germanic sala; hall, house), busto (dairy), cabana (cabin), lama (pastures), fonte (well, spring), pena (fort), pomar (orchard) and vale (valley). This kind of name is present all over Northern Portugal:

b) Sigefredo (Siegfried = victorious peace), Gondomar (the first element means «sword»), Arganil (from hargis, army), Adães e Adufe (from hathus = fight); hildis (= fight) and Tagilde, etc.; Tresmonde, Trasmil, etc. from thras (= dispute); for Ermesinde and Esposende comes sinths (= military expedition). Also citing Antenor Nascentes pg. XXI of his "Dicionário Etimológico da Língua Portuguesa":

 Adães (Barcelos) to Athus= fight
 Aldão (Feira) to Aldonaci < Alds or Altheis
 Aldarete (Peso da Régua) to Alderedus
 Adaúfe (Braga) to Ulfe= wolf
 Aldreu (Barcelos) to Alde + reth < Alderedus
 Santiago de Ribeira de Alhariz (Valpaços) to Aliarici, genitive of Aliaricus
 Alvarenga (Aveiro) to Alfarr, from alfr ("elf") + herr ("army")
 Amonde (Viana do Castelo) to Monde= Protection
 Arganil (Coimbra) to Hargis= army
 Armamar (Viseu) to Mar= Horse
 Baltar (Paredes) to Baltarii, genitive of Baltharius
 Dume (Braga) to döm= church, cathedral
 Escariz (Arouca) to Rico= Lord
 Ermesinde (Valongo) to Sinde < sinth= military expedition
 Esmoriz (Aveiro) to Rico= Lord
 Esposende (Braga) to Sende= path
 Fafiães (Marco de Canaveses)
 Freamunde (Paços de Ferreira) to Mundis= protection
 Germunde (Aveiro) to Mundis= protection
 Gudim (Peso da Régua) to Suebian Goodwinn
 Gomesende to Gumesindi, genitive of Gumesindus
 Gondomar (Porto) to Gundemari, genitive of Gundemarus
 Gondim (Maia) to Guntini, genitive of Guntinus
 Guimarães to Vimaranis, to Weig-mar
 São Paio de Merelim (Braga) to Merelinus + uilla 
 Mondariz to Munderici, genitive of Mundericus
 Mondim de Basto to Mundis + uilla
 Redufe (St. Emilião) to Ulfe= wolf
 Rendufe (Amares)
 Resende (Viseu) to Sende= path
 Roriz (St. Tirso) to Rico= Lord, noble
 Ruães (Braga) to Rodanis, toponymic
 Sandim (Vila Nova de Gaia) to Sande= truthful
 Sendim (Miranda do Douro) to Sende= path
 Tagilde (Vizela) to Hildis= combat, fight
 Tibães (Braga) to Tibianes < Tibianis(?)
 Trasmil to thras= dispute, skirmish 
 Tresmonde (Ponte de Lima) to thras + mundis= skirmish-protection
 Trouxemil (Coimbra) to Miro= famous

Several thousand such toponyms are known in northern Portugal, Galicia, western Asturias and other territories which were part of the Suebi kingdom.

Notes

Literature

Proto-Germanic reconstruction 
 Orel, Vladimir (2003). Handbook of Germanic Etymology. Leiden: Brill, 2003. .
 Köbler, Gerhard. (2007). Germanisches Wörterbuch. On-line .
 Kroonen, Guus. (2013). Etymological Dictionary of Proto-Germanic. Leiden: Brill, 2013. .

Germanic personal names 
 Förstemanm, Ernst (1900).  Altdeutsches Namenbuch. P. Hanstein: Bonn, 1900.
 Fossner, Thorvald  (1916). Continental-Germanic personal names in England in Old and Middle English times. Uppsala, 1916.
 Redin, Mats (1919). Studies on uncompounded personal names  in old English. Uppsala, 1919.
 Schönfeld, M. (1911). Wörterbuch der Altgermanischen Personen und Völkernamen. Heidelberg, 1911.
 Searle, W. G. (1897). Onomasticon Anglo-Saxonicum. Cambridge: 1897.

Galician-Portuguese Medieval onomastics 
 Rivas Quintas, Elixio (1991) Onomástica persoal do noroeste hispano. Alvarellos: Lugo, 1991. .
 Boullón Agrelo, Ana I. (1999). Antroponimia medieval galega (ss. VIII-XII). Tübingen: Niemeyer, 1999. .

Germanic toponymy in Galicia and Portugal 
 Sachs, Georg (1932) Die germanischen Ortsnamen in Spanien und Portugal. Jena: Leipzig, 1932.
 Piel, J. (1933-1940) Os nomes germânicos na toponímia portuguesa. In Boletim Português de Filologia vol. II-VII: Lisboa.

Forenames

 Rodrigo= from Germanic Hrodric/Hrēðrīc/Rørik/Hrœrekr (Roderick, Rodrick, Roderich; a compound of hrod 'renown' + ric 'power(ful)'), from the Proto-Germanic *Hrōþirīk(i)az; it was borne by the last of the Visigoth kings and is one of the most common Lusophone personal names of Germanic origin.[]

Surnames

 Araújo, Araujo= toponymic, from Gothic 'Ruderic'
 (van) Zeller, VanZeller= Originally Flemish "Zellaer", in Portugal since the 13th century. From Germanic 'kellā̌ri',< Lat. 'cellārium' (cellar)

Arabic
Between the 8th and mid 13th centuries, Portugal was occupied and under the influence of the Islamic Emirate of Cordoba known as (Al-Andalus). During that period, although the local populations continued to speak Western Romance, and further south Mozarabic dialects; Arabic being the elite language, lent many new words to Portuguese, thanks to a rich cultural and scientific legacy left in the Iberian Peninsula and the Western world in the Middle Ages.

List of Portuguese words of Arabic origin

 alvenarias (al-binaa) البناء

Influences from outside Europe

See also
 History of the Portuguese language
 Differences between Spanish and Portuguese
 List of Brazil state name etymologies
 Portuguese exonyms
 Portuguese language
 Portuguese names
 List of most common surnames (See Brazil and Portugal)
 List of French words of Germanic origin
 List of Galician words of Germanic origin
 Germanic personal names in Galicia#Germanic toponymy in Galicia and Portugal
List of Portuguese words of Italian origin
Germanic names in Italy, similar developments

References

Sources

External links

 Contrastive Romance Lexicology at Orbis Latinus
 Pranto and llanto, but not chanto – On Portuguese etymology A comparison of sound changes in Portuguese and other Romance languages
 Portuguese words of Germanic origin
 Portuguese Vocabulary Online, Free resources for Portuguese learners
 Linguistic history of Portuguese at the website of the Instituto Camões
 WILLIAMS, E.B. From Latin to Portuguese
 MACHADO, J.P. Dicionário Etimológico da Língua Portuguesa

Portuguese Germanic
Vocabulary, Portuguese
Vocabulary, Portuguese
Lexis (linguistics)